

108001–108100 

|-bgcolor=#fefefe
| 108001 ||  || — || March 21, 2001 || Anderson Mesa || LONEOS || V || align=right | 1.4 km || 
|-id=002 bgcolor=#fefefe
| 108002 ||  || — || March 21, 2001 || Anderson Mesa || LONEOS || — || align=right | 1.6 km || 
|-id=003 bgcolor=#fefefe
| 108003 ||  || — || March 21, 2001 || Haleakala || NEAT || — || align=right | 1.7 km || 
|-id=004 bgcolor=#E9E9E9
| 108004 ||  || — || March 21, 2001 || Haleakala || NEAT || — || align=right | 5.0 km || 
|-id=005 bgcolor=#fefefe
| 108005 ||  || — || March 21, 2001 || Haleakala || NEAT || FLO || align=right | 1.4 km || 
|-id=006 bgcolor=#d6d6d6
| 108006 ||  || — || March 21, 2001 || Haleakala || NEAT || — || align=right | 8.0 km || 
|-id=007 bgcolor=#E9E9E9
| 108007 ||  || — || March 23, 2001 || Socorro || LINEAR || EUN || align=right | 2.5 km || 
|-id=008 bgcolor=#fefefe
| 108008 ||  || — || March 23, 2001 || Anderson Mesa || LONEOS || — || align=right | 1.8 km || 
|-id=009 bgcolor=#fefefe
| 108009 ||  || — || March 23, 2001 || Haleakala || NEAT || — || align=right | 1.7 km || 
|-id=010 bgcolor=#fefefe
| 108010 ||  || — || March 23, 2001 || Kitt Peak || Spacewatch || MAS || align=right | 1.5 km || 
|-id=011 bgcolor=#fefefe
| 108011 ||  || — || March 23, 2001 || Anderson Mesa || LONEOS || FLO || align=right | 1.3 km || 
|-id=012 bgcolor=#E9E9E9
| 108012 ||  || — || March 23, 2001 || Anderson Mesa || LONEOS || — || align=right | 4.0 km || 
|-id=013 bgcolor=#fefefe
| 108013 ||  || — || March 23, 2001 || Anderson Mesa || LONEOS || — || align=right | 1.3 km || 
|-id=014 bgcolor=#E9E9E9
| 108014 ||  || — || March 23, 2001 || Anderson Mesa || LONEOS || — || align=right | 3.1 km || 
|-id=015 bgcolor=#E9E9E9
| 108015 ||  || — || March 23, 2001 || Haleakala || NEAT || — || align=right | 5.0 km || 
|-id=016 bgcolor=#E9E9E9
| 108016 ||  || — || March 23, 2001 || Haleakala || NEAT || — || align=right | 4.1 km || 
|-id=017 bgcolor=#fefefe
| 108017 ||  || — || March 24, 2001 || Anderson Mesa || LONEOS || — || align=right | 1.8 km || 
|-id=018 bgcolor=#E9E9E9
| 108018 ||  || — || March 24, 2001 || Anderson Mesa || LONEOS || — || align=right | 2.0 km || 
|-id=019 bgcolor=#fefefe
| 108019 ||  || — || March 24, 2001 || Anderson Mesa || LONEOS || — || align=right | 1.2 km || 
|-id=020 bgcolor=#fefefe
| 108020 ||  || — || March 24, 2001 || Socorro || LINEAR || NYS || align=right | 1.3 km || 
|-id=021 bgcolor=#fefefe
| 108021 ||  || — || March 24, 2001 || Anderson Mesa || LONEOS || — || align=right | 1.4 km || 
|-id=022 bgcolor=#fefefe
| 108022 ||  || — || March 24, 2001 || Socorro || LINEAR || NYS || align=right | 1.5 km || 
|-id=023 bgcolor=#E9E9E9
| 108023 ||  || — || March 24, 2001 || Anderson Mesa || LONEOS || — || align=right | 2.1 km || 
|-id=024 bgcolor=#E9E9E9
| 108024 ||  || — || March 24, 2001 || Socorro || LINEAR || — || align=right | 2.7 km || 
|-id=025 bgcolor=#E9E9E9
| 108025 ||  || — || March 24, 2001 || Anderson Mesa || LONEOS || — || align=right | 2.8 km || 
|-id=026 bgcolor=#E9E9E9
| 108026 ||  || — || March 24, 2001 || Anderson Mesa || LONEOS || — || align=right | 4.1 km || 
|-id=027 bgcolor=#E9E9E9
| 108027 ||  || — || March 24, 2001 || Anderson Mesa || LONEOS || — || align=right | 2.2 km || 
|-id=028 bgcolor=#fefefe
| 108028 ||  || — || March 24, 2001 || Anderson Mesa || LONEOS || — || align=right | 1.6 km || 
|-id=029 bgcolor=#fefefe
| 108029 ||  || — || March 24, 2001 || Kitt Peak || Spacewatch || — || align=right | 1.2 km || 
|-id=030 bgcolor=#E9E9E9
| 108030 ||  || — || March 24, 2001 || Haleakala || NEAT || — || align=right | 2.2 km || 
|-id=031 bgcolor=#fefefe
| 108031 ||  || — || March 26, 2001 || Socorro || LINEAR || FLO || align=right | 1.8 km || 
|-id=032 bgcolor=#fefefe
| 108032 ||  || — || March 26, 2001 || Socorro || LINEAR || — || align=right | 1.8 km || 
|-id=033 bgcolor=#fefefe
| 108033 ||  || — || March 26, 2001 || Socorro || LINEAR || FLO || align=right | 1.00 km || 
|-id=034 bgcolor=#d6d6d6
| 108034 ||  || — || March 26, 2001 || Socorro || LINEAR || — || align=right | 6.1 km || 
|-id=035 bgcolor=#E9E9E9
| 108035 ||  || — || March 26, 2001 || Haleakala || NEAT || — || align=right | 1.8 km || 
|-id=036 bgcolor=#d6d6d6
| 108036 ||  || — || March 26, 2001 || Socorro || LINEAR || HYG || align=right | 6.8 km || 
|-id=037 bgcolor=#fefefe
| 108037 ||  || — || March 26, 2001 || Socorro || LINEAR || ERI || align=right | 2.4 km || 
|-id=038 bgcolor=#E9E9E9
| 108038 ||  || — || March 26, 2001 || Socorro || LINEAR || — || align=right | 1.8 km || 
|-id=039 bgcolor=#d6d6d6
| 108039 ||  || — || March 26, 2001 || Socorro || LINEAR || — || align=right | 7.6 km || 
|-id=040 bgcolor=#fefefe
| 108040 ||  || — || March 26, 2001 || Socorro || LINEAR || — || align=right | 4.1 km || 
|-id=041 bgcolor=#fefefe
| 108041 ||  || — || March 26, 2001 || Socorro || LINEAR || — || align=right | 1.4 km || 
|-id=042 bgcolor=#fefefe
| 108042 ||  || — || March 26, 2001 || Socorro || LINEAR || FLO || align=right | 1.1 km || 
|-id=043 bgcolor=#E9E9E9
| 108043 ||  || — || March 26, 2001 || Socorro || LINEAR || — || align=right | 2.0 km || 
|-id=044 bgcolor=#E9E9E9
| 108044 ||  || — || March 26, 2001 || Socorro || LINEAR || — || align=right | 3.3 km || 
|-id=045 bgcolor=#E9E9E9
| 108045 ||  || — || March 26, 2001 || Socorro || LINEAR || — || align=right | 4.0 km || 
|-id=046 bgcolor=#fefefe
| 108046 ||  || — || March 26, 2001 || Haleakala || NEAT || MAS || align=right | 1.3 km || 
|-id=047 bgcolor=#E9E9E9
| 108047 ||  || — || March 27, 2001 || Anderson Mesa || LONEOS || MRX || align=right | 2.4 km || 
|-id=048 bgcolor=#fefefe
| 108048 ||  || — || March 27, 2001 || Anderson Mesa || LONEOS || — || align=right | 1.9 km || 
|-id=049 bgcolor=#E9E9E9
| 108049 ||  || — || March 27, 2001 || Anderson Mesa || LONEOS || GEF || align=right | 2.6 km || 
|-id=050 bgcolor=#E9E9E9
| 108050 ||  || — || March 27, 2001 || Anderson Mesa || LONEOS || — || align=right | 2.2 km || 
|-id=051 bgcolor=#fefefe
| 108051 ||  || — || March 27, 2001 || Anderson Mesa || LONEOS || — || align=right | 1.9 km || 
|-id=052 bgcolor=#E9E9E9
| 108052 ||  || — || March 27, 2001 || Haleakala || NEAT || — || align=right | 2.2 km || 
|-id=053 bgcolor=#fefefe
| 108053 ||  || — || March 27, 2001 || Haleakala || NEAT || — || align=right | 1.4 km || 
|-id=054 bgcolor=#E9E9E9
| 108054 ||  || — || March 27, 2001 || Haleakala || NEAT || — || align=right | 1.5 km || 
|-id=055 bgcolor=#E9E9E9
| 108055 ||  || — || March 27, 2001 || Haleakala || NEAT || — || align=right | 4.2 km || 
|-id=056 bgcolor=#E9E9E9
| 108056 ||  || — || March 29, 2001 || Anderson Mesa || LONEOS || — || align=right | 3.6 km || 
|-id=057 bgcolor=#fefefe
| 108057 ||  || — || March 29, 2001 || Anderson Mesa || LONEOS || NYS || align=right | 1.1 km || 
|-id=058 bgcolor=#E9E9E9
| 108058 ||  || — || March 29, 2001 || Anderson Mesa || LONEOS || — || align=right | 1.6 km || 
|-id=059 bgcolor=#E9E9E9
| 108059 ||  || — || March 29, 2001 || Anderson Mesa || LONEOS || JUN || align=right | 1.5 km || 
|-id=060 bgcolor=#E9E9E9
| 108060 ||  || — || March 29, 2001 || Socorro || LINEAR || — || align=right | 2.5 km || 
|-id=061 bgcolor=#fefefe
| 108061 ||  || — || March 29, 2001 || Haleakala || NEAT || — || align=right | 2.1 km || 
|-id=062 bgcolor=#fefefe
| 108062 ||  || — || March 29, 2001 || Haleakala || NEAT || — || align=right | 1.8 km || 
|-id=063 bgcolor=#E9E9E9
| 108063 ||  || — || March 30, 2001 || Kitt Peak || Spacewatch || VIB || align=right | 4.8 km || 
|-id=064 bgcolor=#E9E9E9
| 108064 ||  || — || March 30, 2001 || Socorro || LINEAR || — || align=right | 4.1 km || 
|-id=065 bgcolor=#E9E9E9
| 108065 ||  || — || March 30, 2001 || Haleakala || NEAT || MIT || align=right | 5.5 km || 
|-id=066 bgcolor=#fefefe
| 108066 ||  || — || March 18, 2001 || Socorro || LINEAR || — || align=right | 1.5 km || 
|-id=067 bgcolor=#fefefe
| 108067 ||  || — || March 19, 2001 || Socorro || LINEAR || slow || align=right | 1.8 km || 
|-id=068 bgcolor=#fefefe
| 108068 ||  || — || March 19, 2001 || Haleakala || NEAT || V || align=right | 1.2 km || 
|-id=069 bgcolor=#fefefe
| 108069 ||  || — || March 19, 2001 || Haleakala || NEAT || — || align=right | 3.5 km || 
|-id=070 bgcolor=#fefefe
| 108070 ||  || — || March 19, 2001 || Socorro || LINEAR || V || align=right | 1.5 km || 
|-id=071 bgcolor=#E9E9E9
| 108071 ||  || — || March 19, 2001 || Anderson Mesa || LONEOS || MAR || align=right | 2.4 km || 
|-id=072 bgcolor=#E9E9E9
| 108072 Odifreddi ||  ||  || March 22, 2001 || Cima Ekar || ADAS || HOF || align=right | 4.3 km || 
|-id=073 bgcolor=#d6d6d6
| 108073 ||  || — || March 23, 2001 || Anderson Mesa || LONEOS || — || align=right | 7.6 km || 
|-id=074 bgcolor=#fefefe
| 108074 ||  || — || March 23, 2001 || Anderson Mesa || LONEOS || FLO || align=right | 1.6 km || 
|-id=075 bgcolor=#d6d6d6
| 108075 ||  || — || March 23, 2001 || Haleakala || NEAT || JLI || align=right | 7.7 km || 
|-id=076 bgcolor=#E9E9E9
| 108076 ||  || — || March 24, 2001 || Anderson Mesa || LONEOS || — || align=right | 2.8 km || 
|-id=077 bgcolor=#E9E9E9
| 108077 ||  || — || March 24, 2001 || Socorro || LINEAR || — || align=right | 2.0 km || 
|-id=078 bgcolor=#fefefe
| 108078 ||  || — || March 24, 2001 || Anderson Mesa || LONEOS || — || align=right | 1.9 km || 
|-id=079 bgcolor=#fefefe
| 108079 ||  || — || March 24, 2001 || Anderson Mesa || LONEOS || NYS || align=right data-sort-value="0.99" | 990 m || 
|-id=080 bgcolor=#fefefe
| 108080 ||  || — || March 24, 2001 || Haleakala || NEAT || — || align=right | 2.5 km || 
|-id=081 bgcolor=#E9E9E9
| 108081 ||  || — || March 24, 2001 || Haleakala || NEAT || BAR || align=right | 3.3 km || 
|-id=082 bgcolor=#E9E9E9
| 108082 ||  || — || March 24, 2001 || Haleakala || NEAT || — || align=right | 2.7 km || 
|-id=083 bgcolor=#E9E9E9
| 108083 ||  || — || March 24, 2001 || Haleakala || NEAT || — || align=right | 2.4 km || 
|-id=084 bgcolor=#fefefe
| 108084 ||  || — || March 24, 2001 || Haleakala || NEAT || — || align=right | 4.8 km || 
|-id=085 bgcolor=#E9E9E9
| 108085 ||  || — || March 25, 2001 || Anderson Mesa || LONEOS || — || align=right | 2.9 km || 
|-id=086 bgcolor=#fefefe
| 108086 ||  || — || March 21, 2001 || Kitt Peak || Spacewatch || NYS || align=right | 1.3 km || 
|-id=087 bgcolor=#fefefe
| 108087 ||  || — || March 19, 2001 || Uccle || T. Pauwels || FLO || align=right | 2.3 km || 
|-id=088 bgcolor=#fefefe
| 108088 ||  || — || March 20, 2001 || Anderson Mesa || LONEOS || FLO || align=right | 1.5 km || 
|-id=089 bgcolor=#d6d6d6
| 108089 ||  || — || March 20, 2001 || Anderson Mesa || LONEOS || — || align=right | 5.3 km || 
|-id=090 bgcolor=#E9E9E9
| 108090 ||  || — || March 16, 2001 || Socorro || LINEAR || — || align=right | 3.3 km || 
|-id=091 bgcolor=#d6d6d6
| 108091 ||  || — || March 16, 2001 || Socorro || LINEAR || — || align=right | 7.8 km || 
|-id=092 bgcolor=#fefefe
| 108092 ||  || — || March 18, 2001 || Socorro || LINEAR || NYS || align=right | 1.3 km || 
|-id=093 bgcolor=#E9E9E9
| 108093 ||  || — || March 19, 2001 || Socorro || LINEAR || — || align=right | 3.4 km || 
|-id=094 bgcolor=#E9E9E9
| 108094 ||  || — || March 20, 2001 || Anderson Mesa || LONEOS || MAR || align=right | 2.2 km || 
|-id=095 bgcolor=#d6d6d6
| 108095 ||  || — || March 20, 2001 || Anderson Mesa || LONEOS || EOS || align=right | 4.8 km || 
|-id=096 bgcolor=#fefefe
| 108096 Melvin ||  ||  || March 25, 2001 || Kitt Peak || M. W. Buie || — || align=right | 1.7 km || 
|-id=097 bgcolor=#E9E9E9
| 108097 Satcher ||  ||  || March 26, 2001 || Kitt Peak || M. W. Buie || MRX || align=right | 1.8 km || 
|-id=098 bgcolor=#E9E9E9
| 108098 ||  || — || March 16, 2001 || Socorro || LINEAR || — || align=right | 4.7 km || 
|-id=099 bgcolor=#E9E9E9
| 108099 ||  || — || March 18, 2001 || Haleakala || NEAT || — || align=right | 5.1 km || 
|-id=100 bgcolor=#fefefe
| 108100 ||  || — || March 16, 2001 || Socorro || LINEAR || — || align=right | 1.9 km || 
|}

108101–108200 

|-bgcolor=#E9E9E9
| 108101 ||  || — || March 16, 2001 || Socorro || LINEAR || — || align=right | 4.5 km || 
|-id=102 bgcolor=#E9E9E9
| 108102 ||  || — || March 16, 2001 || Socorro || LINEAR || EUN || align=right | 1.9 km || 
|-id=103 bgcolor=#d6d6d6
| 108103 ||  || — || March 16, 2001 || Socorro || LINEAR || — || align=right | 6.8 km || 
|-id=104 bgcolor=#E9E9E9
| 108104 ||  || — || March 18, 2001 || Socorro || LINEAR || WIT || align=right | 2.1 km || 
|-id=105 bgcolor=#E9E9E9
| 108105 ||  || — || March 18, 2001 || Socorro || LINEAR || HEN || align=right | 2.2 km || 
|-id=106 bgcolor=#E9E9E9
| 108106 ||  || — || March 19, 2001 || Socorro || LINEAR || — || align=right | 1.5 km || 
|-id=107 bgcolor=#fefefe
| 108107 ||  || — || March 21, 2001 || Haleakala || NEAT || — || align=right | 1.4 km || 
|-id=108 bgcolor=#fefefe
| 108108 ||  || — || March 22, 2001 || Cima Ekar || ADAS || — || align=right | 1.4 km || 
|-id=109 bgcolor=#E9E9E9
| 108109 ||  || — || March 24, 2001 || Anderson Mesa || LONEOS || — || align=right | 1.7 km || 
|-id=110 bgcolor=#E9E9E9
| 108110 ||  || — || March 20, 2001 || Anderson Mesa || LONEOS || NEM || align=right | 4.6 km || 
|-id=111 bgcolor=#E9E9E9
| 108111 ||  || — || March 19, 2001 || Anderson Mesa || LONEOS || — || align=right | 2.7 km || 
|-id=112 bgcolor=#fefefe
| 108112 ||  || — || March 23, 2001 || Anderson Mesa || LONEOS || — || align=right | 1.7 km || 
|-id=113 bgcolor=#E9E9E9
| 108113 Maza ||  ||  || April 14, 2001 || Pla D'Arguines || R. Ferrando || — || align=right | 4.7 km || 
|-id=114 bgcolor=#E9E9E9
| 108114 ||  || — || April 15, 2001 || Desert Beaver || W. K. Y. Yeung || ADE || align=right | 5.6 km || 
|-id=115 bgcolor=#d6d6d6
| 108115 ||  || — || April 13, 2001 || Kitt Peak || Spacewatch || — || align=right | 5.8 km || 
|-id=116 bgcolor=#E9E9E9
| 108116 ||  || — || April 14, 2001 || Socorro || LINEAR || — || align=right | 6.0 km || 
|-id=117 bgcolor=#fefefe
| 108117 ||  || — || April 14, 2001 || Socorro || LINEAR || — || align=right | 3.0 km || 
|-id=118 bgcolor=#E9E9E9
| 108118 ||  || — || April 14, 2001 || Socorro || LINEAR || — || align=right | 2.8 km || 
|-id=119 bgcolor=#E9E9E9
| 108119 ||  || — || April 15, 2001 || Socorro || LINEAR || MAR || align=right | 2.2 km || 
|-id=120 bgcolor=#fefefe
| 108120 ||  || — || April 15, 2001 || Socorro || LINEAR || — || align=right | 3.9 km || 
|-id=121 bgcolor=#d6d6d6
| 108121 ||  || — || April 15, 2001 || Socorro || LINEAR || — || align=right | 6.1 km || 
|-id=122 bgcolor=#E9E9E9
| 108122 ||  || — || April 14, 2001 || Kitt Peak || Spacewatch || — || align=right | 5.2 km || 
|-id=123 bgcolor=#E9E9E9
| 108123 ||  || — || April 14, 2001 || Kitt Peak || Spacewatch || — || align=right | 2.1 km || 
|-id=124 bgcolor=#E9E9E9
| 108124 ||  || — || April 15, 2001 || Anderson Mesa || LONEOS || — || align=right | 2.1 km || 
|-id=125 bgcolor=#E9E9E9
| 108125 ||  || — || April 15, 2001 || Socorro || LINEAR || ADE || align=right | 4.4 km || 
|-id=126 bgcolor=#E9E9E9
| 108126 ||  || — || April 15, 2001 || Socorro || LINEAR || — || align=right | 2.5 km || 
|-id=127 bgcolor=#E9E9E9
| 108127 ||  || — || April 15, 2001 || Socorro || LINEAR || RAF || align=right | 2.6 km || 
|-id=128 bgcolor=#E9E9E9
| 108128 ||  || — || April 15, 2001 || Socorro || LINEAR || — || align=right | 1.8 km || 
|-id=129 bgcolor=#fefefe
| 108129 ||  || — || April 15, 2001 || Socorro || LINEAR || V || align=right | 1.2 km || 
|-id=130 bgcolor=#fefefe
| 108130 ||  || — || April 15, 2001 || Socorro || LINEAR || FLO || align=right | 1.3 km || 
|-id=131 bgcolor=#E9E9E9
| 108131 ||  || — || April 15, 2001 || Socorro || LINEAR || — || align=right | 2.5 km || 
|-id=132 bgcolor=#fefefe
| 108132 ||  || — || April 15, 2001 || Socorro || LINEAR || — || align=right | 1.8 km || 
|-id=133 bgcolor=#E9E9E9
| 108133 ||  || — || April 15, 2001 || Socorro || LINEAR || EUN || align=right | 2.1 km || 
|-id=134 bgcolor=#E9E9E9
| 108134 ||  || — || April 15, 2001 || Socorro || LINEAR || ADE || align=right | 4.5 km || 
|-id=135 bgcolor=#E9E9E9
| 108135 ||  || — || April 15, 2001 || Haleakala || NEAT || — || align=right | 3.7 km || 
|-id=136 bgcolor=#fefefe
| 108136 ||  || — || April 15, 2001 || Haleakala || NEAT || — || align=right | 1.4 km || 
|-id=137 bgcolor=#E9E9E9
| 108137 ||  || — || April 15, 2001 || Haleakala || NEAT || — || align=right | 2.1 km || 
|-id=138 bgcolor=#fefefe
| 108138 ||  || — || April 15, 2001 || Haleakala || NEAT || 417 || align=right | 1.8 km || 
|-id=139 bgcolor=#E9E9E9
| 108139 ||  || — || April 14, 2001 || Socorro || LINEAR || — || align=right | 3.3 km || 
|-id=140 bgcolor=#E9E9E9
| 108140 Alir || 2001 HO ||  || April 16, 2001 || Saint-Véran || Saint-Véran Obs. || — || align=right | 2.7 km || 
|-id=141 bgcolor=#E9E9E9
| 108141 ||  || — || April 16, 2001 || Socorro || LINEAR || — || align=right | 2.9 km || 
|-id=142 bgcolor=#d6d6d6
| 108142 ||  || — || April 17, 2001 || Socorro || LINEAR || — || align=right | 6.7 km || 
|-id=143 bgcolor=#E9E9E9
| 108143 ||  || — || April 17, 2001 || Socorro || LINEAR || — || align=right | 2.5 km || 
|-id=144 bgcolor=#fefefe
| 108144 ||  || — || April 17, 2001 || Socorro || LINEAR || V || align=right | 1.5 km || 
|-id=145 bgcolor=#fefefe
| 108145 ||  || — || April 17, 2001 || Socorro || LINEAR || NYS || align=right | 1.3 km || 
|-id=146 bgcolor=#fefefe
| 108146 ||  || — || April 17, 2001 || Socorro || LINEAR || — || align=right | 1.2 km || 
|-id=147 bgcolor=#fefefe
| 108147 ||  || — || April 17, 2001 || Socorro || LINEAR || NYS || align=right | 3.1 km || 
|-id=148 bgcolor=#E9E9E9
| 108148 ||  || — || April 17, 2001 || Socorro || LINEAR || EUN || align=right | 2.9 km || 
|-id=149 bgcolor=#E9E9E9
| 108149 ||  || — || April 17, 2001 || Socorro || LINEAR || — || align=right | 1.8 km || 
|-id=150 bgcolor=#E9E9E9
| 108150 ||  || — || April 17, 2001 || Socorro || LINEAR || — || align=right | 3.7 km || 
|-id=151 bgcolor=#E9E9E9
| 108151 ||  || — || April 17, 2001 || Socorro || LINEAR || — || align=right | 2.2 km || 
|-id=152 bgcolor=#E9E9E9
| 108152 ||  || — || April 17, 2001 || Socorro || LINEAR || EUN || align=right | 2.6 km || 
|-id=153 bgcolor=#E9E9E9
| 108153 ||  || — || April 17, 2001 || Socorro || LINEAR || HEN || align=right | 2.5 km || 
|-id=154 bgcolor=#E9E9E9
| 108154 ||  || — || April 17, 2001 || Socorro || LINEAR || — || align=right | 2.2 km || 
|-id=155 bgcolor=#E9E9E9
| 108155 ||  || — || April 18, 2001 || Haleakala || NEAT || — || align=right | 3.7 km || 
|-id=156 bgcolor=#fefefe
| 108156 ||  || — || April 17, 2001 || Desert Beaver || W. K. Y. Yeung || NYS || align=right | 1.3 km || 
|-id=157 bgcolor=#E9E9E9
| 108157 ||  || — || April 16, 2001 || Socorro || LINEAR || — || align=right | 5.0 km || 
|-id=158 bgcolor=#E9E9E9
| 108158 ||  || — || April 16, 2001 || Socorro || LINEAR || — || align=right | 5.2 km || 
|-id=159 bgcolor=#fefefe
| 108159 ||  || — || April 18, 2001 || Socorro || LINEAR || EUT || align=right | 1.3 km || 
|-id=160 bgcolor=#E9E9E9
| 108160 ||  || — || April 18, 2001 || Socorro || LINEAR || — || align=right | 2.3 km || 
|-id=161 bgcolor=#E9E9E9
| 108161 ||  || — || April 18, 2001 || Socorro || LINEAR || — || align=right | 3.2 km || 
|-id=162 bgcolor=#fefefe
| 108162 ||  || — || April 18, 2001 || Socorro || LINEAR || V || align=right | 1.7 km || 
|-id=163 bgcolor=#E9E9E9
| 108163 ||  || — || April 18, 2001 || Socorro || LINEAR || MARslow || align=right | 4.4 km || 
|-id=164 bgcolor=#E9E9E9
| 108164 ||  || — || April 18, 2001 || Socorro || LINEAR || — || align=right | 2.7 km || 
|-id=165 bgcolor=#E9E9E9
| 108165 ||  || — || April 18, 2001 || Socorro || LINEAR || — || align=right | 2.3 km || 
|-id=166 bgcolor=#fefefe
| 108166 ||  || — || April 21, 2001 || Kitt Peak || Spacewatch || — || align=right | 1.4 km || 
|-id=167 bgcolor=#E9E9E9
| 108167 ||  || — || April 18, 2001 || Kitt Peak || Spacewatch || — || align=right | 2.6 km || 
|-id=168 bgcolor=#E9E9E9
| 108168 ||  || — || April 18, 2001 || Kitt Peak || Spacewatch || — || align=right | 1.7 km || 
|-id=169 bgcolor=#E9E9E9
| 108169 ||  || — || April 21, 2001 || Kitt Peak || Spacewatch || — || align=right | 1.5 km || 
|-id=170 bgcolor=#E9E9E9
| 108170 ||  || — || April 16, 2001 || Socorro || LINEAR || EUN || align=right | 2.3 km || 
|-id=171 bgcolor=#E9E9E9
| 108171 ||  || — || April 16, 2001 || Socorro || LINEAR || — || align=right | 2.3 km || 
|-id=172 bgcolor=#E9E9E9
| 108172 ||  || — || April 16, 2001 || Socorro || LINEAR || — || align=right | 3.5 km || 
|-id=173 bgcolor=#E9E9E9
| 108173 ||  || — || April 17, 2001 || Socorro || LINEAR || — || align=right | 3.2 km || 
|-id=174 bgcolor=#E9E9E9
| 108174 ||  || — || April 18, 2001 || Socorro || LINEAR || MIS || align=right | 4.8 km || 
|-id=175 bgcolor=#fefefe
| 108175 ||  || — || April 18, 2001 || Socorro || LINEAR || NYS || align=right | 1.4 km || 
|-id=176 bgcolor=#fefefe
| 108176 ||  || — || April 18, 2001 || Socorro || LINEAR || — || align=right | 1.4 km || 
|-id=177 bgcolor=#fefefe
| 108177 ||  || — || April 18, 2001 || Socorro || LINEAR || — || align=right | 1.5 km || 
|-id=178 bgcolor=#fefefe
| 108178 ||  || — || April 18, 2001 || Socorro || LINEAR || V || align=right | 1.2 km || 
|-id=179 bgcolor=#E9E9E9
| 108179 ||  || — || April 18, 2001 || Socorro || LINEAR || — || align=right | 2.1 km || 
|-id=180 bgcolor=#fefefe
| 108180 ||  || — || April 18, 2001 || Socorro || LINEAR || — || align=right | 1.5 km || 
|-id=181 bgcolor=#fefefe
| 108181 ||  || — || April 21, 2001 || Socorro || LINEAR || — || align=right | 1.3 km || 
|-id=182 bgcolor=#FA8072
| 108182 ||  || — || April 23, 2001 || Kitt Peak || Spacewatch || — || align=right | 1.6 km || 
|-id=183 bgcolor=#fefefe
| 108183 ||  || — || April 23, 2001 || Reedy Creek || J. Broughton || NYS || align=right | 1.3 km || 
|-id=184 bgcolor=#fefefe
| 108184 ||  || — || April 23, 2001 || Anderson Mesa || LONEOS || — || align=right | 3.3 km || 
|-id=185 bgcolor=#fefefe
| 108185 ||  || — || April 24, 2001 || Anderson Mesa || LONEOS || — || align=right | 1.6 km || 
|-id=186 bgcolor=#E9E9E9
| 108186 ||  || — || April 24, 2001 || Reedy Creek || J. Broughton || — || align=right | 3.4 km || 
|-id=187 bgcolor=#fefefe
| 108187 ||  || — || April 23, 2001 || Desert Beaver || W. K. Y. Yeung || — || align=right | 1.5 km || 
|-id=188 bgcolor=#E9E9E9
| 108188 ||  || — || April 23, 2001 || Desert Beaver || W. K. Y. Yeung || RAF || align=right | 2.0 km || 
|-id=189 bgcolor=#E9E9E9
| 108189 ||  || — || April 23, 2001 || Desert Beaver || W. K. Y. Yeung || — || align=right | 2.3 km || 
|-id=190 bgcolor=#fefefe
| 108190 ||  || — || April 23, 2001 || Desert Beaver || W. K. Y. Yeung || — || align=right | 1.9 km || 
|-id=191 bgcolor=#fefefe
| 108191 ||  || — || April 24, 2001 || Kitt Peak || Spacewatch || — || align=right | 1.5 km || 
|-id=192 bgcolor=#E9E9E9
| 108192 ||  || — || April 24, 2001 || Kitt Peak || Spacewatch || — || align=right | 1.7 km || 
|-id=193 bgcolor=#E9E9E9
| 108193 ||  || — || April 24, 2001 || Kitt Peak || Spacewatch || VIB || align=right | 3.8 km || 
|-id=194 bgcolor=#E9E9E9
| 108194 ||  || — || April 21, 2001 || Socorro || LINEAR || — || align=right | 4.0 km || 
|-id=195 bgcolor=#E9E9E9
| 108195 ||  || — || April 21, 2001 || Socorro || LINEAR || BRU || align=right | 5.5 km || 
|-id=196 bgcolor=#E9E9E9
| 108196 ||  || — || April 21, 2001 || Socorro || LINEAR || — || align=right | 3.7 km || 
|-id=197 bgcolor=#fefefe
| 108197 ||  || — || April 23, 2001 || Socorro || LINEAR || — || align=right | 1.4 km || 
|-id=198 bgcolor=#E9E9E9
| 108198 ||  || — || April 23, 2001 || Socorro || LINEAR || — || align=right | 3.8 km || 
|-id=199 bgcolor=#E9E9E9
| 108199 ||  || — || April 23, 2001 || Socorro || LINEAR || — || align=right | 5.3 km || 
|-id=200 bgcolor=#fefefe
| 108200 ||  || — || April 23, 2001 || Socorro || LINEAR || — || align=right | 1.1 km || 
|}

108201–108300 

|-bgcolor=#E9E9E9
| 108201 Di Blasi ||  ||  || April 27, 2001 || Farra d'Isonzo || Farra d'Isonzo || — || align=right | 5.4 km || 
|-id=202 bgcolor=#E9E9E9
| 108202 ||  || — || April 25, 2001 || Desert Beaver || W. K. Y. Yeung || — || align=right | 2.1 km || 
|-id=203 bgcolor=#E9E9E9
| 108203 ||  || — || April 26, 2001 || Desert Beaver || W. K. Y. Yeung || — || align=right | 3.6 km || 
|-id=204 bgcolor=#fefefe
| 108204 ||  || — || April 26, 2001 || Desert Beaver || W. K. Y. Yeung || — || align=right | 1.8 km || 
|-id=205 bgcolor=#E9E9E9
| 108205 Baccipaolo ||  ||  || April 26, 2001 || San Marcello || L. Tesi, G. Forti || — || align=right | 2.1 km || 
|-id=206 bgcolor=#E9E9E9
| 108206 ||  || — || April 26, 2001 || Kitt Peak || Spacewatch || — || align=right | 3.6 km || 
|-id=207 bgcolor=#E9E9E9
| 108207 ||  || — || April 27, 2001 || Kitt Peak || Spacewatch || — || align=right | 2.4 km || 
|-id=208 bgcolor=#fefefe
| 108208 ||  || — || April 27, 2001 || Socorro || LINEAR || — || align=right | 1.4 km || 
|-id=209 bgcolor=#fefefe
| 108209 ||  || — || April 27, 2001 || Socorro || LINEAR || — || align=right | 1.8 km || 
|-id=210 bgcolor=#E9E9E9
| 108210 ||  || — || April 27, 2001 || Socorro || LINEAR || — || align=right | 1.9 km || 
|-id=211 bgcolor=#fefefe
| 108211 ||  || — || April 27, 2001 || Socorro || LINEAR || — || align=right | 1.5 km || 
|-id=212 bgcolor=#fefefe
| 108212 ||  || — || April 27, 2001 || Socorro || LINEAR || — || align=right | 1.4 km || 
|-id=213 bgcolor=#E9E9E9
| 108213 ||  || — || April 26, 2001 || Kitt Peak || Spacewatch || — || align=right | 2.2 km || 
|-id=214 bgcolor=#E9E9E9
| 108214 ||  || — || April 26, 2001 || Kitt Peak || Spacewatch || — || align=right | 4.4 km || 
|-id=215 bgcolor=#fefefe
| 108215 ||  || — || April 26, 2001 || Kitt Peak || Spacewatch || — || align=right | 1.2 km || 
|-id=216 bgcolor=#E9E9E9
| 108216 ||  || — || April 27, 2001 || Kitt Peak || Spacewatch || — || align=right | 1.9 km || 
|-id=217 bgcolor=#E9E9E9
| 108217 ||  || — || April 26, 2001 || Desert Beaver || W. K. Y. Yeung || — || align=right | 4.1 km || 
|-id=218 bgcolor=#fefefe
| 108218 ||  || — || April 26, 2001 || Desert Beaver || W. K. Y. Yeung || — || align=right | 1.7 km || 
|-id=219 bgcolor=#E9E9E9
| 108219 ||  || — || April 23, 2001 || Socorro || LINEAR || — || align=right | 2.5 km || 
|-id=220 bgcolor=#fefefe
| 108220 ||  || — || April 27, 2001 || Socorro || LINEAR || NYS || align=right | 1.1 km || 
|-id=221 bgcolor=#E9E9E9
| 108221 ||  || — || April 27, 2001 || Socorro || LINEAR || — || align=right | 2.8 km || 
|-id=222 bgcolor=#fefefe
| 108222 ||  || — || April 27, 2001 || Socorro || LINEAR || — || align=right | 1.3 km || 
|-id=223 bgcolor=#fefefe
| 108223 ||  || — || April 27, 2001 || Socorro || LINEAR || — || align=right | 1.4 km || 
|-id=224 bgcolor=#fefefe
| 108224 ||  || — || April 27, 2001 || Socorro || LINEAR || — || align=right | 1.9 km || 
|-id=225 bgcolor=#E9E9E9
| 108225 ||  || — || April 29, 2001 || Socorro || LINEAR || — || align=right | 2.2 km || 
|-id=226 bgcolor=#E9E9E9
| 108226 ||  || — || April 29, 2001 || Socorro || LINEAR || — || align=right | 2.0 km || 
|-id=227 bgcolor=#E9E9E9
| 108227 ||  || — || April 29, 2001 || Socorro || LINEAR || ADE || align=right | 4.6 km || 
|-id=228 bgcolor=#E9E9E9
| 108228 ||  || — || April 29, 2001 || Socorro || LINEAR || — || align=right | 4.6 km || 
|-id=229 bgcolor=#E9E9E9
| 108229 ||  || — || April 29, 2001 || Črni Vrh || Črni Vrh || — || align=right | 3.3 km || 
|-id=230 bgcolor=#E9E9E9
| 108230 ||  || — || April 26, 2001 || Kitt Peak || Spacewatch || — || align=right | 2.6 km || 
|-id=231 bgcolor=#fefefe
| 108231 ||  || — || April 26, 2001 || Kitt Peak || Spacewatch || — || align=right | 1.3 km || 
|-id=232 bgcolor=#E9E9E9
| 108232 ||  || — || April 26, 2001 || Kitt Peak || Spacewatch || — || align=right | 1.5 km || 
|-id=233 bgcolor=#fefefe
| 108233 ||  || — || April 26, 2001 || Kitt Peak || Spacewatch || NYS || align=right | 1.1 km || 
|-id=234 bgcolor=#fefefe
| 108234 ||  || — || April 27, 2001 || Socorro || LINEAR || — || align=right | 3.0 km || 
|-id=235 bgcolor=#E9E9E9
| 108235 ||  || — || April 27, 2001 || Socorro || LINEAR || — || align=right | 3.5 km || 
|-id=236 bgcolor=#E9E9E9
| 108236 ||  || — || April 27, 2001 || Socorro || LINEAR || — || align=right | 2.0 km || 
|-id=237 bgcolor=#E9E9E9
| 108237 ||  || — || April 30, 2001 || Socorro || LINEAR || — || align=right | 3.4 km || 
|-id=238 bgcolor=#E9E9E9
| 108238 ||  || — || April 30, 2001 || Kitt Peak || Spacewatch || — || align=right | 3.3 km || 
|-id=239 bgcolor=#fefefe
| 108239 ||  || — || April 16, 2001 || Anderson Mesa || LONEOS || V || align=right | 1.4 km || 
|-id=240 bgcolor=#fefefe
| 108240 ||  || — || April 16, 2001 || Anderson Mesa || LONEOS || — || align=right | 1.5 km || 
|-id=241 bgcolor=#E9E9E9
| 108241 ||  || — || April 16, 2001 || Anderson Mesa || LONEOS || — || align=right | 2.6 km || 
|-id=242 bgcolor=#fefefe
| 108242 ||  || — || April 16, 2001 || Socorro || LINEAR || — || align=right | 1.5 km || 
|-id=243 bgcolor=#fefefe
| 108243 ||  || — || April 16, 2001 || Anderson Mesa || LONEOS || — || align=right | 1.6 km || 
|-id=244 bgcolor=#E9E9E9
| 108244 ||  || — || April 16, 2001 || Anderson Mesa || LONEOS || PAD || align=right | 4.2 km || 
|-id=245 bgcolor=#d6d6d6
| 108245 ||  || — || April 16, 2001 || Anderson Mesa || LONEOS || EOS || align=right | 4.8 km || 
|-id=246 bgcolor=#fefefe
| 108246 ||  || — || April 16, 2001 || Socorro || LINEAR || — || align=right | 1.6 km || 
|-id=247 bgcolor=#d6d6d6
| 108247 ||  || — || April 16, 2001 || Kitt Peak || Spacewatch || — || align=right | 4.4 km || 
|-id=248 bgcolor=#E9E9E9
| 108248 ||  || — || April 17, 2001 || Anderson Mesa || LONEOS || — || align=right | 2.7 km || 
|-id=249 bgcolor=#fefefe
| 108249 ||  || — || April 17, 2001 || Anderson Mesa || LONEOS || — || align=right | 1.2 km || 
|-id=250 bgcolor=#fefefe
| 108250 ||  || — || April 17, 2001 || Črni Vrh || Črni Vrh || V || align=right | 1.6 km || 
|-id=251 bgcolor=#E9E9E9
| 108251 ||  || — || April 18, 2001 || Haleakala || NEAT || — || align=right | 2.2 km || 
|-id=252 bgcolor=#E9E9E9
| 108252 ||  || — || April 19, 2001 || Haleakala || NEAT || — || align=right | 2.3 km || 
|-id=253 bgcolor=#E9E9E9
| 108253 ||  || — || April 21, 2001 || Socorro || LINEAR || — || align=right | 3.3 km || 
|-id=254 bgcolor=#E9E9E9
| 108254 ||  || — || April 21, 2001 || Socorro || LINEAR || MAR || align=right | 2.6 km || 
|-id=255 bgcolor=#fefefe
| 108255 ||  || — || April 21, 2001 || Socorro || LINEAR || FLO || align=right | 1.4 km || 
|-id=256 bgcolor=#E9E9E9
| 108256 ||  || — || April 21, 2001 || Socorro || LINEAR || — || align=right | 2.7 km || 
|-id=257 bgcolor=#E9E9E9
| 108257 ||  || — || April 22, 2001 || Kitt Peak || Spacewatch || GEF || align=right | 3.7 km || 
|-id=258 bgcolor=#d6d6d6
| 108258 ||  || — || April 23, 2001 || Socorro || LINEAR || EOS || align=right | 5.1 km || 
|-id=259 bgcolor=#fefefe
| 108259 ||  || — || April 23, 2001 || Socorro || LINEAR || FLO || align=right | 1.3 km || 
|-id=260 bgcolor=#fefefe
| 108260 ||  || — || April 23, 2001 || Socorro || LINEAR || — || align=right | 1.5 km || 
|-id=261 bgcolor=#d6d6d6
| 108261 ||  || — || April 23, 2001 || Socorro || LINEAR || ALA || align=right | 7.9 km || 
|-id=262 bgcolor=#E9E9E9
| 108262 ||  || — || April 23, 2001 || Socorro || LINEAR || EUN || align=right | 2.2 km || 
|-id=263 bgcolor=#E9E9E9
| 108263 ||  || — || April 23, 2001 || Kitt Peak || Spacewatch || GEF || align=right | 2.7 km || 
|-id=264 bgcolor=#E9E9E9
| 108264 ||  || — || April 24, 2001 || Socorro || LINEAR || — || align=right | 1.9 km || 
|-id=265 bgcolor=#fefefe
| 108265 ||  || — || April 24, 2001 || Socorro || LINEAR || — || align=right | 1.8 km || 
|-id=266 bgcolor=#fefefe
| 108266 ||  || — || April 24, 2001 || Socorro || LINEAR || — || align=right | 3.2 km || 
|-id=267 bgcolor=#fefefe
| 108267 ||  || — || April 24, 2001 || Socorro || LINEAR || V || align=right | 1.3 km || 
|-id=268 bgcolor=#fefefe
| 108268 ||  || — || April 24, 2001 || Socorro || LINEAR || FLO || align=right | 1.3 km || 
|-id=269 bgcolor=#d6d6d6
| 108269 ||  || — || April 24, 2001 || Palomar || NEAT || YAK || align=right | 6.1 km || 
|-id=270 bgcolor=#E9E9E9
| 108270 ||  || — || April 24, 2001 || Haleakala || NEAT || — || align=right | 2.7 km || 
|-id=271 bgcolor=#fefefe
| 108271 ||  || — || April 24, 2001 || Haleakala || NEAT || — || align=right | 1.4 km || 
|-id=272 bgcolor=#fefefe
| 108272 ||  || — || April 24, 2001 || Haleakala || NEAT || — || align=right | 1.3 km || 
|-id=273 bgcolor=#E9E9E9
| 108273 ||  || — || April 24, 2001 || Haleakala || NEAT || — || align=right | 3.5 km || 
|-id=274 bgcolor=#E9E9E9
| 108274 ||  || — || April 25, 2001 || Anderson Mesa || LONEOS || — || align=right | 2.2 km || 
|-id=275 bgcolor=#E9E9E9
| 108275 ||  || — || April 25, 2001 || Anderson Mesa || LONEOS || — || align=right | 3.2 km || 
|-id=276 bgcolor=#E9E9E9
| 108276 ||  || — || April 25, 2001 || Anderson Mesa || LONEOS || — || align=right | 2.6 km || 
|-id=277 bgcolor=#E9E9E9
| 108277 ||  || — || April 25, 2001 || Haleakala || NEAT || — || align=right | 3.7 km || 
|-id=278 bgcolor=#E9E9E9
| 108278 ||  || — || April 21, 2001 || Socorro || LINEAR || — || align=right | 1.9 km || 
|-id=279 bgcolor=#fefefe
| 108279 ||  || — || April 23, 2001 || Socorro || LINEAR || NYS || align=right | 1.3 km || 
|-id=280 bgcolor=#fefefe
| 108280 ||  || — || April 23, 2001 || Socorro || LINEAR || — || align=right | 4.6 km || 
|-id=281 bgcolor=#E9E9E9
| 108281 ||  || — || April 24, 2001 || Anderson Mesa || LONEOS || — || align=right | 2.0 km || 
|-id=282 bgcolor=#E9E9E9
| 108282 ||  || — || April 24, 2001 || Anderson Mesa || LONEOS || EUN || align=right | 2.5 km || 
|-id=283 bgcolor=#fefefe
| 108283 ||  || — || April 24, 2001 || Anderson Mesa || LONEOS || — || align=right | 1.4 km || 
|-id=284 bgcolor=#E9E9E9
| 108284 ||  || — || April 24, 2001 || Anderson Mesa || LONEOS || — || align=right | 2.8 km || 
|-id=285 bgcolor=#fefefe
| 108285 ||  || — || April 24, 2001 || Haleakala || NEAT || NYS || align=right | 1.2 km || 
|-id=286 bgcolor=#E9E9E9
| 108286 ||  || — || April 24, 2001 || Haleakala || NEAT || NEM || align=right | 4.6 km || 
|-id=287 bgcolor=#fefefe
| 108287 ||  || — || April 24, 2001 || Haleakala || NEAT || — || align=right | 1.3 km || 
|-id=288 bgcolor=#fefefe
| 108288 ||  || — || April 25, 2001 || Haleakala || NEAT || FLO || align=right data-sort-value="0.92" | 920 m || 
|-id=289 bgcolor=#fefefe
| 108289 ||  || — || April 26, 2001 || Anderson Mesa || LONEOS || — || align=right | 1.2 km || 
|-id=290 bgcolor=#d6d6d6
| 108290 ||  || — || April 26, 2001 || Anderson Mesa || LONEOS || — || align=right | 3.7 km || 
|-id=291 bgcolor=#E9E9E9
| 108291 ||  || — || April 26, 2001 || Anderson Mesa || LONEOS || — || align=right | 2.1 km || 
|-id=292 bgcolor=#E9E9E9
| 108292 ||  || — || April 26, 2001 || Anderson Mesa || LONEOS || EUN || align=right | 2.9 km || 
|-id=293 bgcolor=#fefefe
| 108293 ||  || — || April 26, 2001 || Anderson Mesa || LONEOS || NYS || align=right | 1.2 km || 
|-id=294 bgcolor=#E9E9E9
| 108294 ||  || — || April 26, 2001 || Anderson Mesa || LONEOS || EUN || align=right | 3.2 km || 
|-id=295 bgcolor=#E9E9E9
| 108295 ||  || — || April 27, 2001 || Kitt Peak || Spacewatch || MRX || align=right | 2.3 km || 
|-id=296 bgcolor=#E9E9E9
| 108296 ||  || — || April 28, 2001 || Kitt Peak || Spacewatch || — || align=right | 2.8 km || 
|-id=297 bgcolor=#FA8072
| 108297 ||  || — || April 30, 2001 || Socorro || LINEAR || — || align=right | 1.6 km || 
|-id=298 bgcolor=#fefefe
| 108298 ||  || — || April 24, 2001 || Kitt Peak || Spacewatch || — || align=right | 1.6 km || 
|-id=299 bgcolor=#E9E9E9
| 108299 ||  || — || April 16, 2001 || Socorro || LINEAR || — || align=right | 1.8 km || 
|-id=300 bgcolor=#E9E9E9
| 108300 ||  || — || April 23, 2001 || Socorro || LINEAR || — || align=right | 2.6 km || 
|}

108301–108400 

|-bgcolor=#d6d6d6
| 108301 || 2001 JK || — || May 2, 2001 || Palomar || NEAT || — || align=right | 6.2 km || 
|-id=302 bgcolor=#E9E9E9
| 108302 || 2001 JL || — || May 2, 2001 || Palomar || NEAT || — || align=right | 6.1 km || 
|-id=303 bgcolor=#E9E9E9
| 108303 || 2001 JN || — || May 2, 2001 || Palomar || NEAT || — || align=right | 4.7 km || 
|-id=304 bgcolor=#E9E9E9
| 108304 || 2001 JP || — || May 2, 2001 || Palomar || NEAT || GEF || align=right | 2.7 km || 
|-id=305 bgcolor=#E9E9E9
| 108305 || 2001 JX || — || May 11, 2001 || Ondřejov || L. Kotková || AGN || align=right | 2.6 km || 
|-id=306 bgcolor=#d6d6d6
| 108306 || 2001 JZ || — || May 11, 2001 || Ondřejov || L. Kotková || — || align=right | 6.0 km || 
|-id=307 bgcolor=#fefefe
| 108307 ||  || — || May 13, 2001 || Olathe || L. Robinson || — || align=right | 1.2 km || 
|-id=308 bgcolor=#E9E9E9
| 108308 ||  || — || May 13, 2001 || Farpoint || G. Hug || — || align=right | 1.8 km || 
|-id=309 bgcolor=#fefefe
| 108309 ||  || — || May 15, 2001 || Kitt Peak || Spacewatch || V || align=right | 1.1 km || 
|-id=310 bgcolor=#E9E9E9
| 108310 ||  || — || May 15, 2001 || Kitt Peak || Spacewatch || — || align=right | 7.1 km || 
|-id=311 bgcolor=#d6d6d6
| 108311 ||  || — || May 15, 2001 || Haleakala || NEAT || — || align=right | 6.7 km || 
|-id=312 bgcolor=#E9E9E9
| 108312 ||  || — || May 15, 2001 || Haleakala || NEAT || AGN || align=right | 2.7 km || 
|-id=313 bgcolor=#E9E9E9
| 108313 ||  || — || May 15, 2001 || Anderson Mesa || LONEOS || — || align=right | 3.7 km || 
|-id=314 bgcolor=#E9E9E9
| 108314 ||  || — || May 14, 2001 || Kitt Peak || Spacewatch || — || align=right | 3.1 km || 
|-id=315 bgcolor=#E9E9E9
| 108315 ||  || — || May 15, 2001 || Anderson Mesa || LONEOS || — || align=right | 2.8 km || 
|-id=316 bgcolor=#fefefe
| 108316 ||  || — || May 14, 2001 || Kitt Peak || Spacewatch || FLO || align=right | 1.2 km || 
|-id=317 bgcolor=#d6d6d6
| 108317 ||  || — || May 14, 2001 || Palomar || NEAT || EOS || align=right | 5.3 km || 
|-id=318 bgcolor=#fefefe
| 108318 ||  || — || May 14, 2001 || Haleakala || NEAT || V || align=right | 1.2 km || 
|-id=319 bgcolor=#E9E9E9
| 108319 ||  || — || May 15, 2001 || Anderson Mesa || LONEOS || — || align=right | 2.2 km || 
|-id=320 bgcolor=#fefefe
| 108320 ||  || — || May 15, 2001 || Anderson Mesa || LONEOS || — || align=right | 1.5 km || 
|-id=321 bgcolor=#E9E9E9
| 108321 ||  || — || May 15, 2001 || Anderson Mesa || LONEOS || — || align=right | 2.5 km || 
|-id=322 bgcolor=#E9E9E9
| 108322 ||  || — || May 15, 2001 || Palomar || NEAT || — || align=right | 2.9 km || 
|-id=323 bgcolor=#E9E9E9
| 108323 ||  || — || May 15, 2001 || Haleakala || NEAT || — || align=right | 1.7 km || 
|-id=324 bgcolor=#d6d6d6
| 108324 || 2001 KB || — || May 16, 2001 || Nogales || Tenagra II Obs. || — || align=right | 5.5 km || 
|-id=325 bgcolor=#E9E9E9
| 108325 || 2001 KV || — || May 17, 2001 || Socorro || LINEAR || — || align=right | 3.9 km || 
|-id=326 bgcolor=#E9E9E9
| 108326 || 2001 KY || — || May 17, 2001 || Socorro || LINEAR || INO || align=right | 2.6 km || 
|-id=327 bgcolor=#fefefe
| 108327 ||  || — || May 17, 2001 || Socorro || LINEAR || — || align=right | 1.6 km || 
|-id=328 bgcolor=#fefefe
| 108328 ||  || — || May 17, 2001 || Socorro || LINEAR || — || align=right | 1.5 km || 
|-id=329 bgcolor=#E9E9E9
| 108329 ||  || — || May 17, 2001 || Socorro || LINEAR || — || align=right | 5.8 km || 
|-id=330 bgcolor=#fefefe
| 108330 ||  || — || May 17, 2001 || Socorro || LINEAR || — || align=right | 2.0 km || 
|-id=331 bgcolor=#E9E9E9
| 108331 ||  || — || May 16, 2001 || Kitt Peak || Spacewatch || GEF || align=right | 2.1 km || 
|-id=332 bgcolor=#fefefe
| 108332 ||  || — || May 18, 2001 || Socorro || LINEAR || — || align=right | 1.8 km || 
|-id=333 bgcolor=#fefefe
| 108333 ||  || — || May 18, 2001 || Socorro || LINEAR || FLO || align=right | 1.2 km || 
|-id=334 bgcolor=#E9E9E9
| 108334 ||  || — || May 17, 2001 || Socorro || LINEAR || — || align=right | 1.7 km || 
|-id=335 bgcolor=#E9E9E9
| 108335 ||  || — || May 17, 2001 || Socorro || LINEAR || — || align=right | 3.6 km || 
|-id=336 bgcolor=#fefefe
| 108336 ||  || — || May 17, 2001 || Socorro || LINEAR || NYS || align=right data-sort-value="0.92" | 920 m || 
|-id=337 bgcolor=#fefefe
| 108337 ||  || — || May 17, 2001 || Socorro || LINEAR || V || align=right | 1.8 km || 
|-id=338 bgcolor=#E9E9E9
| 108338 ||  || — || May 17, 2001 || Socorro || LINEAR || EUN || align=right | 2.3 km || 
|-id=339 bgcolor=#fefefe
| 108339 ||  || — || May 17, 2001 || Socorro || LINEAR || — || align=right | 1.4 km || 
|-id=340 bgcolor=#fefefe
| 108340 ||  || — || May 17, 2001 || Socorro || LINEAR || FLO || align=right | 1.4 km || 
|-id=341 bgcolor=#fefefe
| 108341 ||  || — || May 17, 2001 || Socorro || LINEAR || — || align=right | 3.1 km || 
|-id=342 bgcolor=#E9E9E9
| 108342 ||  || — || May 17, 2001 || Socorro || LINEAR || — || align=right | 2.1 km || 
|-id=343 bgcolor=#fefefe
| 108343 ||  || — || May 17, 2001 || Socorro || LINEAR || — || align=right | 2.0 km || 
|-id=344 bgcolor=#fefefe
| 108344 ||  || — || May 18, 2001 || Socorro || LINEAR || — || align=right | 2.4 km || 
|-id=345 bgcolor=#fefefe
| 108345 ||  || — || May 18, 2001 || Socorro || LINEAR || NYS || align=right | 1.1 km || 
|-id=346 bgcolor=#E9E9E9
| 108346 ||  || — || May 18, 2001 || Socorro || LINEAR || KON || align=right | 4.9 km || 
|-id=347 bgcolor=#fefefe
| 108347 ||  || — || May 18, 2001 || Socorro || LINEAR || V || align=right | 1.2 km || 
|-id=348 bgcolor=#E9E9E9
| 108348 ||  || — || May 18, 2001 || Socorro || LINEAR || — || align=right | 2.4 km || 
|-id=349 bgcolor=#E9E9E9
| 108349 ||  || — || May 18, 2001 || Socorro || LINEAR || — || align=right | 2.0 km || 
|-id=350 bgcolor=#fefefe
| 108350 ||  || — || May 18, 2001 || Socorro || LINEAR || MAS || align=right | 1.4 km || 
|-id=351 bgcolor=#E9E9E9
| 108351 ||  || — || May 18, 2001 || Socorro || LINEAR || — || align=right | 2.9 km || 
|-id=352 bgcolor=#E9E9E9
| 108352 ||  || — || May 18, 2001 || Socorro || LINEAR || EUN || align=right | 2.1 km || 
|-id=353 bgcolor=#d6d6d6
| 108353 ||  || — || May 18, 2001 || Socorro || LINEAR || — || align=right | 9.5 km || 
|-id=354 bgcolor=#fefefe
| 108354 ||  || — || May 18, 2001 || Socorro || LINEAR || — || align=right | 1.7 km || 
|-id=355 bgcolor=#d6d6d6
| 108355 ||  || — || May 18, 2001 || Socorro || LINEAR || — || align=right | 7.9 km || 
|-id=356 bgcolor=#E9E9E9
| 108356 ||  || — || May 18, 2001 || Socorro || LINEAR || — || align=right | 2.4 km || 
|-id=357 bgcolor=#d6d6d6
| 108357 ||  || — || May 18, 2001 || Socorro || LINEAR || — || align=right | 8.4 km || 
|-id=358 bgcolor=#E9E9E9
| 108358 ||  || — || May 18, 2001 || Socorro || LINEAR || — || align=right | 2.3 km || 
|-id=359 bgcolor=#E9E9E9
| 108359 ||  || — || May 18, 2001 || Socorro || LINEAR || — || align=right | 2.8 km || 
|-id=360 bgcolor=#fefefe
| 108360 ||  || — || May 17, 2001 || Socorro || LINEAR || — || align=right | 1.6 km || 
|-id=361 bgcolor=#E9E9E9
| 108361 ||  || — || May 18, 2001 || Socorro || LINEAR || GEF || align=right | 6.1 km || 
|-id=362 bgcolor=#E9E9E9
| 108362 ||  || — || May 18, 2001 || Socorro || LINEAR || — || align=right | 3.7 km || 
|-id=363 bgcolor=#fefefe
| 108363 ||  || — || May 18, 2001 || Socorro || LINEAR || NYS || align=right | 1.6 km || 
|-id=364 bgcolor=#E9E9E9
| 108364 ||  || — || May 18, 2001 || Socorro || LINEAR || — || align=right | 2.7 km || 
|-id=365 bgcolor=#E9E9E9
| 108365 ||  || — || May 18, 2001 || Socorro || LINEAR || EUN || align=right | 2.2 km || 
|-id=366 bgcolor=#E9E9E9
| 108366 ||  || — || May 18, 2001 || Socorro || LINEAR || — || align=right | 6.5 km || 
|-id=367 bgcolor=#E9E9E9
| 108367 ||  || — || May 18, 2001 || Socorro || LINEAR || — || align=right | 1.8 km || 
|-id=368 bgcolor=#fefefe
| 108368 ||  || — || May 21, 2001 || Socorro || LINEAR || NYS || align=right | 1.4 km || 
|-id=369 bgcolor=#fefefe
| 108369 ||  || — || May 20, 2001 || Bergisch Gladbach || W. Bickel || — || align=right | 1.8 km || 
|-id=370 bgcolor=#fefefe
| 108370 ||  || — || May 21, 2001 || Kitt Peak || Spacewatch || V || align=right | 1.1 km || 
|-id=371 bgcolor=#E9E9E9
| 108371 ||  || — || May 18, 2001 || Socorro || LINEAR || — || align=right | 3.0 km || 
|-id=372 bgcolor=#d6d6d6
| 108372 ||  || — || May 18, 2001 || Socorro || LINEAR || EOS || align=right | 5.0 km || 
|-id=373 bgcolor=#fefefe
| 108373 ||  || — || May 21, 2001 || Socorro || LINEAR || — || align=right | 1.5 km || 
|-id=374 bgcolor=#E9E9E9
| 108374 ||  || — || May 22, 2001 || Socorro || LINEAR || MAR || align=right | 3.3 km || 
|-id=375 bgcolor=#E9E9E9
| 108375 ||  || — || May 22, 2001 || Socorro || LINEAR || RAF || align=right | 2.1 km || 
|-id=376 bgcolor=#FA8072
| 108376 ||  || — || May 22, 2001 || Socorro || LINEAR || PHO || align=right | 1.6 km || 
|-id=377 bgcolor=#fefefe
| 108377 ||  || — || May 23, 2001 || Desert Beaver || W. K. Y. Yeung || — || align=right | 1.5 km || 
|-id=378 bgcolor=#E9E9E9
| 108378 ||  || — || May 22, 2001 || Ondřejov || P. Pravec, P. Kušnirák || HEN || align=right | 1.5 km || 
|-id=379 bgcolor=#d6d6d6
| 108379 ||  || — || May 17, 2001 || Kitt Peak || Spacewatch || — || align=right | 5.2 km || 
|-id=380 bgcolor=#E9E9E9
| 108380 ||  || — || May 21, 2001 || Anderson Mesa || LONEOS || MRX || align=right | 2.2 km || 
|-id=381 bgcolor=#E9E9E9
| 108381 ||  || — || May 21, 2001 || Anderson Mesa || LONEOS || HNS || align=right | 3.3 km || 
|-id=382 bgcolor=#E9E9E9
| 108382 Karencilevitz ||  ||  || May 18, 2001 || OCA-Anza || M. Collins, M. White || HNS || align=right | 2.5 km || 
|-id=383 bgcolor=#fefefe
| 108383 ||  || — || May 17, 2001 || Socorro || LINEAR || NYS || align=right | 1.1 km || 
|-id=384 bgcolor=#fefefe
| 108384 ||  || — || May 17, 2001 || Socorro || LINEAR || — || align=right | 1.6 km || 
|-id=385 bgcolor=#E9E9E9
| 108385 ||  || — || May 17, 2001 || Socorro || LINEAR || — || align=right | 2.9 km || 
|-id=386 bgcolor=#d6d6d6
| 108386 ||  || — || May 17, 2001 || Socorro || LINEAR || EOS || align=right | 4.1 km || 
|-id=387 bgcolor=#E9E9E9
| 108387 ||  || — || May 17, 2001 || Socorro || LINEAR || — || align=right | 3.1 km || 
|-id=388 bgcolor=#E9E9E9
| 108388 ||  || — || May 17, 2001 || Socorro || LINEAR || — || align=right | 2.1 km || 
|-id=389 bgcolor=#fefefe
| 108389 ||  || — || May 17, 2001 || Socorro || LINEAR || — || align=right | 2.0 km || 
|-id=390 bgcolor=#fefefe
| 108390 ||  || — || May 17, 2001 || Socorro || LINEAR || V || align=right | 1.2 km || 
|-id=391 bgcolor=#fefefe
| 108391 ||  || — || May 17, 2001 || Socorro || LINEAR || — || align=right | 1.7 km || 
|-id=392 bgcolor=#fefefe
| 108392 ||  || — || May 17, 2001 || Socorro || LINEAR || NYS || align=right | 1.4 km || 
|-id=393 bgcolor=#E9E9E9
| 108393 ||  || — || May 17, 2001 || Socorro || LINEAR || — || align=right | 2.1 km || 
|-id=394 bgcolor=#E9E9E9
| 108394 ||  || — || May 17, 2001 || Socorro || LINEAR || — || align=right | 3.0 km || 
|-id=395 bgcolor=#d6d6d6
| 108395 ||  || — || May 17, 2001 || Socorro || LINEAR || — || align=right | 9.0 km || 
|-id=396 bgcolor=#E9E9E9
| 108396 ||  || — || May 17, 2001 || Socorro || LINEAR || MRX || align=right | 3.3 km || 
|-id=397 bgcolor=#E9E9E9
| 108397 ||  || — || May 17, 2001 || Socorro || LINEAR || — || align=right | 4.0 km || 
|-id=398 bgcolor=#fefefe
| 108398 ||  || — || May 17, 2001 || Socorro || LINEAR || — || align=right | 1.4 km || 
|-id=399 bgcolor=#E9E9E9
| 108399 ||  || — || May 18, 2001 || Socorro || LINEAR || — || align=right | 4.9 km || 
|-id=400 bgcolor=#fefefe
| 108400 ||  || — || May 18, 2001 || Socorro || LINEAR || — || align=right | 1.4 km || 
|}

108401–108500 

|-bgcolor=#E9E9E9
| 108401 ||  || — || May 18, 2001 || Socorro || LINEAR || — || align=right | 3.2 km || 
|-id=402 bgcolor=#E9E9E9
| 108402 ||  || — || May 18, 2001 || Socorro || LINEAR || — || align=right | 5.7 km || 
|-id=403 bgcolor=#E9E9E9
| 108403 ||  || — || May 21, 2001 || Socorro || LINEAR || — || align=right | 2.1 km || 
|-id=404 bgcolor=#E9E9E9
| 108404 ||  || — || May 21, 2001 || Socorro || LINEAR || DOR || align=right | 5.1 km || 
|-id=405 bgcolor=#fefefe
| 108405 ||  || — || May 21, 2001 || Socorro || LINEAR || V || align=right | 1.3 km || 
|-id=406 bgcolor=#fefefe
| 108406 ||  || — || May 21, 2001 || Socorro || LINEAR || V || align=right | 1.5 km || 
|-id=407 bgcolor=#fefefe
| 108407 ||  || — || May 21, 2001 || Socorro || LINEAR || FLO || align=right | 1.0 km || 
|-id=408 bgcolor=#fefefe
| 108408 ||  || — || May 22, 2001 || Socorro || LINEAR || — || align=right | 5.1 km || 
|-id=409 bgcolor=#E9E9E9
| 108409 ||  || — || May 23, 2001 || Socorro || LINEAR || EUN || align=right | 2.3 km || 
|-id=410 bgcolor=#FA8072
| 108410 ||  || — || May 24, 2001 || Kitt Peak || Spacewatch || — || align=right | 1.5 km || 
|-id=411 bgcolor=#fefefe
| 108411 ||  || — || May 23, 2001 || Socorro || LINEAR || — || align=right | 2.1 km || 
|-id=412 bgcolor=#E9E9E9
| 108412 ||  || — || May 18, 2001 || Socorro || LINEAR || ADE || align=right | 4.2 km || 
|-id=413 bgcolor=#E9E9E9
| 108413 ||  || — || May 18, 2001 || Socorro || LINEAR || MAR || align=right | 2.1 km || 
|-id=414 bgcolor=#fefefe
| 108414 ||  || — || May 18, 2001 || Socorro || LINEAR || — || align=right | 1.8 km || 
|-id=415 bgcolor=#d6d6d6
| 108415 ||  || — || May 18, 2001 || Socorro || LINEAR || — || align=right | 7.2 km || 
|-id=416 bgcolor=#fefefe
| 108416 ||  || — || May 18, 2001 || Socorro || LINEAR || — || align=right | 1.6 km || 
|-id=417 bgcolor=#fefefe
| 108417 ||  || — || May 18, 2001 || Socorro || LINEAR || NYS || align=right | 1.3 km || 
|-id=418 bgcolor=#E9E9E9
| 108418 ||  || — || May 18, 2001 || Socorro || LINEAR || — || align=right | 1.9 km || 
|-id=419 bgcolor=#E9E9E9
| 108419 ||  || — || May 18, 2001 || Socorro || LINEAR || — || align=right | 4.9 km || 
|-id=420 bgcolor=#fefefe
| 108420 ||  || — || May 18, 2001 || Socorro || LINEAR || — || align=right | 1.6 km || 
|-id=421 bgcolor=#E9E9E9
| 108421 ||  || — || May 18, 2001 || Socorro || LINEAR || — || align=right | 4.0 km || 
|-id=422 bgcolor=#fefefe
| 108422 ||  || — || May 21, 2001 || Socorro || LINEAR || NYS || align=right | 1.1 km || 
|-id=423 bgcolor=#E9E9E9
| 108423 ||  || — || May 22, 2001 || Socorro || LINEAR || — || align=right | 3.7 km || 
|-id=424 bgcolor=#E9E9E9
| 108424 ||  || — || May 22, 2001 || Socorro || LINEAR || — || align=right | 2.2 km || 
|-id=425 bgcolor=#E9E9E9
| 108425 ||  || — || May 22, 2001 || Socorro || LINEAR || — || align=right | 3.2 km || 
|-id=426 bgcolor=#E9E9E9
| 108426 ||  || — || May 22, 2001 || Socorro || LINEAR || BRG || align=right | 3.6 km || 
|-id=427 bgcolor=#E9E9E9
| 108427 ||  || — || May 22, 2001 || Socorro || LINEAR || — || align=right | 2.4 km || 
|-id=428 bgcolor=#fefefe
| 108428 ||  || — || May 22, 2001 || Socorro || LINEAR || — || align=right | 2.8 km || 
|-id=429 bgcolor=#E9E9E9
| 108429 ||  || — || May 22, 2001 || Socorro || LINEAR || — || align=right | 2.1 km || 
|-id=430 bgcolor=#E9E9E9
| 108430 ||  || — || May 22, 2001 || Socorro || LINEAR || INO || align=right | 2.4 km || 
|-id=431 bgcolor=#fefefe
| 108431 ||  || — || May 22, 2001 || Socorro || LINEAR || PHO || align=right | 2.8 km || 
|-id=432 bgcolor=#E9E9E9
| 108432 ||  || — || May 23, 2001 || Socorro || LINEAR || — || align=right | 2.3 km || 
|-id=433 bgcolor=#E9E9E9
| 108433 ||  || — || May 23, 2001 || Socorro || LINEAR || — || align=right | 2.7 km || 
|-id=434 bgcolor=#fefefe
| 108434 ||  || — || May 24, 2001 || Socorro || LINEAR || — || align=right | 1.5 km || 
|-id=435 bgcolor=#E9E9E9
| 108435 ||  || — || May 24, 2001 || Palomar || NEAT || — || align=right | 6.0 km || 
|-id=436 bgcolor=#fefefe
| 108436 ||  || — || May 22, 2001 || Socorro || LINEAR || V || align=right | 1.1 km || 
|-id=437 bgcolor=#E9E9E9
| 108437 ||  || — || May 22, 2001 || Socorro || LINEAR || — || align=right | 4.2 km || 
|-id=438 bgcolor=#fefefe
| 108438 ||  || — || May 22, 2001 || Socorro || LINEAR || V || align=right | 1.1 km || 
|-id=439 bgcolor=#fefefe
| 108439 ||  || — || May 22, 2001 || Socorro || LINEAR || V || align=right | 1.3 km || 
|-id=440 bgcolor=#E9E9E9
| 108440 ||  || — || May 22, 2001 || Socorro || LINEAR || — || align=right | 4.4 km || 
|-id=441 bgcolor=#E9E9E9
| 108441 ||  || — || May 22, 2001 || Socorro || LINEAR || — || align=right | 2.4 km || 
|-id=442 bgcolor=#fefefe
| 108442 ||  || — || May 22, 2001 || Socorro || LINEAR || — || align=right | 2.3 km || 
|-id=443 bgcolor=#E9E9E9
| 108443 ||  || — || May 22, 2001 || Socorro || LINEAR || DOR || align=right | 6.5 km || 
|-id=444 bgcolor=#E9E9E9
| 108444 ||  || — || May 22, 2001 || Socorro || LINEAR || — || align=right | 2.2 km || 
|-id=445 bgcolor=#d6d6d6
| 108445 ||  || — || May 22, 2001 || Socorro || LINEAR || — || align=right | 5.6 km || 
|-id=446 bgcolor=#E9E9E9
| 108446 ||  || — || May 24, 2001 || Socorro || LINEAR || — || align=right | 2.5 km || 
|-id=447 bgcolor=#fefefe
| 108447 ||  || — || May 24, 2001 || Socorro || LINEAR || NYS || align=right data-sort-value="0.90" | 900 m || 
|-id=448 bgcolor=#fefefe
| 108448 ||  || — || May 24, 2001 || Socorro || LINEAR || NYS || align=right | 1.1 km || 
|-id=449 bgcolor=#E9E9E9
| 108449 ||  || — || May 24, 2001 || Socorro || LINEAR || — || align=right | 1.7 km || 
|-id=450 bgcolor=#E9E9E9
| 108450 ||  || — || May 24, 2001 || Socorro || LINEAR || — || align=right | 4.1 km || 
|-id=451 bgcolor=#fefefe
| 108451 ||  || — || May 24, 2001 || Socorro || LINEAR || MAS || align=right | 1.6 km || 
|-id=452 bgcolor=#E9E9E9
| 108452 ||  || — || May 24, 2001 || Socorro || LINEAR || — || align=right | 6.5 km || 
|-id=453 bgcolor=#fefefe
| 108453 ||  || — || May 24, 2001 || Socorro || LINEAR || NYS || align=right | 1.2 km || 
|-id=454 bgcolor=#E9E9E9
| 108454 ||  || — || May 24, 2001 || Socorro || LINEAR || — || align=right | 2.3 km || 
|-id=455 bgcolor=#d6d6d6
| 108455 ||  || — || May 24, 2001 || Socorro || LINEAR || — || align=right | 10 km || 
|-id=456 bgcolor=#E9E9E9
| 108456 ||  || — || May 24, 2001 || Kitt Peak || Spacewatch || JUN || align=right | 2.3 km || 
|-id=457 bgcolor=#fefefe
| 108457 ||  || — || May 24, 2001 || Socorro || LINEAR || — || align=right | 2.3 km || 
|-id=458 bgcolor=#E9E9E9
| 108458 ||  || — || May 18, 2001 || Anderson Mesa || LONEOS || ADE || align=right | 2.4 km || 
|-id=459 bgcolor=#fefefe
| 108459 ||  || — || May 18, 2001 || Socorro || LINEAR || FLO || align=right | 1.1 km || 
|-id=460 bgcolor=#E9E9E9
| 108460 ||  || — || May 18, 2001 || Haleakala || NEAT || AER || align=right | 2.8 km || 
|-id=461 bgcolor=#E9E9E9
| 108461 ||  || — || May 22, 2001 || Haleakala || NEAT || MIS || align=right | 4.0 km || 
|-id=462 bgcolor=#fefefe
| 108462 ||  || — || May 18, 2001 || Anderson Mesa || LONEOS || — || align=right | 1.6 km || 
|-id=463 bgcolor=#fefefe
| 108463 ||  || — || May 22, 2001 || Socorro || LINEAR || ERI || align=right | 3.5 km || 
|-id=464 bgcolor=#E9E9E9
| 108464 ||  || — || May 22, 2001 || Socorro || LINEAR || HNS || align=right | 2.8 km || 
|-id=465 bgcolor=#E9E9E9
| 108465 ||  || — || May 22, 2001 || Socorro || LINEAR || MIT || align=right | 4.8 km || 
|-id=466 bgcolor=#d6d6d6
| 108466 ||  || — || May 23, 2001 || Socorro || LINEAR || — || align=right | 13 km || 
|-id=467 bgcolor=#E9E9E9
| 108467 ||  || — || May 23, 2001 || Socorro || LINEAR || — || align=right | 3.5 km || 
|-id=468 bgcolor=#E9E9E9
| 108468 ||  || — || May 23, 2001 || Socorro || LINEAR || — || align=right | 2.6 km || 
|-id=469 bgcolor=#d6d6d6
| 108469 ||  || — || May 23, 2001 || Socorro || LINEAR || — || align=right | 4.1 km || 
|-id=470 bgcolor=#E9E9E9
| 108470 ||  || — || May 23, 2001 || Socorro || LINEAR || — || align=right | 3.2 km || 
|-id=471 bgcolor=#E9E9E9
| 108471 ||  || — || May 23, 2001 || Socorro || LINEAR || — || align=right | 3.8 km || 
|-id=472 bgcolor=#E9E9E9
| 108472 ||  || — || May 23, 2001 || Socorro || LINEAR || JUNfast? || align=right | 5.1 km || 
|-id=473 bgcolor=#E9E9E9
| 108473 ||  || — || May 24, 2001 || Socorro || LINEAR || — || align=right | 2.8 km || 
|-id=474 bgcolor=#E9E9E9
| 108474 ||  || — || May 24, 2001 || Socorro || LINEAR || — || align=right | 3.9 km || 
|-id=475 bgcolor=#E9E9E9
| 108475 ||  || — || May 26, 2001 || Socorro || LINEAR || RAF || align=right | 2.0 km || 
|-id=476 bgcolor=#E9E9E9
| 108476 ||  || — || May 26, 2001 || Socorro || LINEAR || — || align=right | 5.3 km || 
|-id=477 bgcolor=#E9E9E9
| 108477 ||  || — || May 26, 2001 || Socorro || LINEAR || — || align=right | 3.0 km || 
|-id=478 bgcolor=#fefefe
| 108478 ||  || — || May 26, 2001 || Socorro || LINEAR || V || align=right | 1.3 km || 
|-id=479 bgcolor=#fefefe
| 108479 ||  || — || May 27, 2001 || Haleakala || NEAT || — || align=right | 2.0 km || 
|-id=480 bgcolor=#fefefe
| 108480 ||  || — || May 16, 2001 || Haleakala || NEAT || — || align=right | 1.6 km || 
|-id=481 bgcolor=#d6d6d6
| 108481 ||  || — || May 16, 2001 || Haleakala || NEAT || — || align=right | 4.8 km || 
|-id=482 bgcolor=#fefefe
| 108482 ||  || — || May 17, 2001 || Socorro || LINEAR || — || align=right | 2.4 km || 
|-id=483 bgcolor=#fefefe
| 108483 ||  || — || May 17, 2001 || Haleakala || NEAT || ERI || align=right | 3.2 km || 
|-id=484 bgcolor=#fefefe
| 108484 ||  || — || May 18, 2001 || Socorro || LINEAR || — || align=right | 2.0 km || 
|-id=485 bgcolor=#E9E9E9
| 108485 ||  || — || May 18, 2001 || Anderson Mesa || LONEOS || — || align=right | 2.9 km || 
|-id=486 bgcolor=#d6d6d6
| 108486 ||  || — || May 18, 2001 || Socorro || LINEAR || — || align=right | 6.0 km || 
|-id=487 bgcolor=#E9E9E9
| 108487 ||  || — || May 18, 2001 || Anderson Mesa || LONEOS || — || align=right | 2.0 km || 
|-id=488 bgcolor=#E9E9E9
| 108488 ||  || — || May 18, 2001 || Anderson Mesa || LONEOS || — || align=right | 4.9 km || 
|-id=489 bgcolor=#E9E9E9
| 108489 ||  || — || May 18, 2001 || Anderson Mesa || LONEOS || — || align=right | 4.8 km || 
|-id=490 bgcolor=#fefefe
| 108490 ||  || — || May 18, 2001 || Haleakala || NEAT || V || align=right | 1.5 km || 
|-id=491 bgcolor=#fefefe
| 108491 ||  || — || May 18, 2001 || Haleakala || NEAT || — || align=right | 2.2 km || 
|-id=492 bgcolor=#E9E9E9
| 108492 ||  || — || May 20, 2001 || Haleakala || NEAT || — || align=right | 2.0 km || 
|-id=493 bgcolor=#E9E9E9
| 108493 ||  || — || May 20, 2001 || Haleakala || NEAT || EUN || align=right | 2.9 km || 
|-id=494 bgcolor=#E9E9E9
| 108494 ||  || — || May 21, 2001 || Socorro || LINEAR || — || align=right | 3.3 km || 
|-id=495 bgcolor=#E9E9E9
| 108495 ||  || — || May 21, 2001 || Anderson Mesa || LONEOS || — || align=right | 2.5 km || 
|-id=496 bgcolor=#E9E9E9
| 108496 Sullenberger ||  ||  || May 21, 2001 || Goodricke-Pigott || R. A. Tucker || EUN || align=right | 2.7 km || 
|-id=497 bgcolor=#fefefe
| 108497 ||  || — || May 21, 2001 || Anderson Mesa || LONEOS || — || align=right | 2.0 km || 
|-id=498 bgcolor=#E9E9E9
| 108498 ||  || — || May 22, 2001 || Anderson Mesa || LONEOS || — || align=right | 2.4 km || 
|-id=499 bgcolor=#E9E9E9
| 108499 ||  || — || May 22, 2001 || Anderson Mesa || LONEOS || MAR || align=right | 2.2 km || 
|-id=500 bgcolor=#E9E9E9
| 108500 ||  || — || May 22, 2001 || Anderson Mesa || LONEOS || GEF || align=right | 2.9 km || 
|}

108501–108600 

|-bgcolor=#E9E9E9
| 108501 ||  || — || May 22, 2001 || Anderson Mesa || LONEOS || — || align=right | 1.6 km || 
|-id=502 bgcolor=#E9E9E9
| 108502 ||  || — || May 23, 2001 || Haleakala || NEAT || — || align=right | 2.6 km || 
|-id=503 bgcolor=#d6d6d6
| 108503 ||  || — || May 25, 2001 || Kitt Peak || Spacewatch || — || align=right | 4.0 km || 
|-id=504 bgcolor=#E9E9E9
| 108504 ||  || — || May 29, 2001 || Palomar || NEAT || — || align=right | 2.9 km || 
|-id=505 bgcolor=#E9E9E9
| 108505 ||  || — || May 18, 2001 || Anderson Mesa || LONEOS || — || align=right | 3.0 km || 
|-id=506 bgcolor=#E9E9E9
| 108506 ||  || — || May 21, 2001 || Socorro || LINEAR || — || align=right | 1.5 km || 
|-id=507 bgcolor=#fefefe
| 108507 ||  || — || May 21, 2001 || Kitt Peak || Spacewatch || — || align=right | 1.7 km || 
|-id=508 bgcolor=#fefefe
| 108508 ||  || — || May 21, 2001 || Kitt Peak || Spacewatch || — || align=right | 1.4 km || 
|-id=509 bgcolor=#E9E9E9
| 108509 ||  || — || May 22, 2001 || Anderson Mesa || LONEOS || — || align=right | 3.2 km || 
|-id=510 bgcolor=#E9E9E9
| 108510 ||  || — || May 24, 2001 || Anderson Mesa || LONEOS || MRX || align=right | 2.1 km || 
|-id=511 bgcolor=#fefefe
| 108511 ||  || — || May 24, 2001 || Socorro || LINEAR || FLO || align=right | 2.8 km || 
|-id=512 bgcolor=#fefefe
| 108512 ||  || — || May 25, 2001 || Socorro || LINEAR || — || align=right | 1.7 km || 
|-id=513 bgcolor=#E9E9E9
| 108513 ||  || — || May 26, 2001 || Socorro || LINEAR || — || align=right | 2.0 km || 
|-id=514 bgcolor=#E9E9E9
| 108514 ||  || — || May 26, 2001 || Socorro || LINEAR || GEF || align=right | 2.3 km || 
|-id=515 bgcolor=#E9E9E9
| 108515 ||  || — || May 27, 2001 || Haleakala || NEAT || XIZ || align=right | 4.8 km || 
|-id=516 bgcolor=#FA8072
| 108516 ||  || — || May 30, 2001 || Anderson Mesa || LONEOS || — || align=right | 2.6 km || 
|-id=517 bgcolor=#E9E9E9
| 108517 ||  || — || May 26, 2001 || Socorro || LINEAR || — || align=right | 4.5 km || 
|-id=518 bgcolor=#d6d6d6
| 108518 ||  || — || May 29, 2001 || Haleakala || NEAT || — || align=right | 5.4 km || 
|-id=519 bgcolor=#FFC2E0
| 108519 || 2001 LF || — || June 3, 2001 || Haleakala || NEAT || AMO +1km || align=right | 1.4 km || 
|-id=520 bgcolor=#fefefe
| 108520 || 2001 LK || — || June 11, 2001 || Desert Beaver || W. K. Y. Yeung || V || align=right | 1.1 km || 
|-id=521 bgcolor=#d6d6d6
| 108521 || 2001 LL || — || June 11, 2001 || Desert Beaver || W. K. Y. Yeung || — || align=right | 7.5 km || 
|-id=522 bgcolor=#FA8072
| 108522 || 2001 LQ || — || June 14, 2001 || Anderson Mesa || LONEOS || — || align=right | 7.0 km || 
|-id=523 bgcolor=#E9E9E9
| 108523 || 2001 LT || — || June 12, 2001 || Kitt Peak || Spacewatch || — || align=right | 2.5 km || 
|-id=524 bgcolor=#E9E9E9
| 108524 ||  || — || June 13, 2001 || Socorro || LINEAR || — || align=right | 2.2 km || 
|-id=525 bgcolor=#fefefe
| 108525 ||  || — || June 13, 2001 || Socorro || LINEAR || NYS || align=right | 1.4 km || 
|-id=526 bgcolor=#fefefe
| 108526 ||  || — || June 13, 2001 || Socorro || LINEAR || — || align=right | 1.5 km || 
|-id=527 bgcolor=#fefefe
| 108527 ||  || — || June 13, 2001 || Socorro || LINEAR || — || align=right | 2.6 km || 
|-id=528 bgcolor=#fefefe
| 108528 ||  || — || June 13, 2001 || Socorro || LINEAR || NYS || align=right | 2.2 km || 
|-id=529 bgcolor=#fefefe
| 108529 ||  || — || June 13, 2001 || Socorro || LINEAR || — || align=right | 2.1 km || 
|-id=530 bgcolor=#E9E9E9
| 108530 ||  || — || June 13, 2001 || Socorro || LINEAR || — || align=right | 5.5 km || 
|-id=531 bgcolor=#fefefe
| 108531 ||  || — || June 13, 2001 || Socorro || LINEAR || — || align=right | 2.6 km || 
|-id=532 bgcolor=#fefefe
| 108532 ||  || — || June 13, 2001 || Socorro || LINEAR || — || align=right | 4.6 km || 
|-id=533 bgcolor=#E9E9E9
| 108533 ||  || — || June 12, 2001 || Palomar || NEAT || RAF || align=right | 2.5 km || 
|-id=534 bgcolor=#E9E9E9
| 108534 ||  || — || June 15, 2001 || Haleakala || NEAT || MAR || align=right | 2.7 km || 
|-id=535 bgcolor=#fefefe
| 108535 ||  || — || June 12, 2001 || Haleakala || NEAT || V || align=right | 1.4 km || 
|-id=536 bgcolor=#d6d6d6
| 108536 ||  || — || June 14, 2001 || Palomar || NEAT || — || align=right | 8.5 km || 
|-id=537 bgcolor=#fefefe
| 108537 ||  || — || June 15, 2001 || Palomar || NEAT || V || align=right | 1.3 km || 
|-id=538 bgcolor=#E9E9E9
| 108538 ||  || — || June 15, 2001 || Socorro || LINEAR || — || align=right | 2.5 km || 
|-id=539 bgcolor=#d6d6d6
| 108539 ||  || — || June 15, 2001 || Palomar || NEAT || — || align=right | 5.7 km || 
|-id=540 bgcolor=#E9E9E9
| 108540 ||  || — || June 15, 2001 || Palomar || NEAT || — || align=right | 2.1 km || 
|-id=541 bgcolor=#d6d6d6
| 108541 ||  || — || June 15, 2001 || Palomar || NEAT || — || align=right | 9.8 km || 
|-id=542 bgcolor=#E9E9E9
| 108542 ||  || — || June 15, 2001 || Socorro || LINEAR || — || align=right | 2.3 km || 
|-id=543 bgcolor=#fefefe
| 108543 ||  || — || June 15, 2001 || Socorro || LINEAR || FLO || align=right | 2.1 km || 
|-id=544 bgcolor=#E9E9E9
| 108544 ||  || — || June 15, 2001 || Socorro || LINEAR || — || align=right | 4.1 km || 
|-id=545 bgcolor=#E9E9E9
| 108545 ||  || — || June 15, 2001 || Socorro || LINEAR || — || align=right | 3.6 km || 
|-id=546 bgcolor=#d6d6d6
| 108546 ||  || — || June 15, 2001 || Socorro || LINEAR || — || align=right | 4.2 km || 
|-id=547 bgcolor=#E9E9E9
| 108547 ||  || — || June 15, 2001 || Socorro || LINEAR || CLO || align=right | 3.8 km || 
|-id=548 bgcolor=#E9E9E9
| 108548 ||  || — || June 15, 2001 || Socorro || LINEAR || — || align=right | 2.5 km || 
|-id=549 bgcolor=#E9E9E9
| 108549 ||  || — || June 15, 2001 || Socorro || LINEAR || PAE || align=right | 4.8 km || 
|-id=550 bgcolor=#E9E9E9
| 108550 ||  || — || June 15, 2001 || Socorro || LINEAR || — || align=right | 3.0 km || 
|-id=551 bgcolor=#fefefe
| 108551 ||  || — || June 15, 2001 || Socorro || LINEAR || — || align=right | 1.9 km || 
|-id=552 bgcolor=#d6d6d6
| 108552 ||  || — || June 15, 2001 || Socorro || LINEAR || — || align=right | 3.6 km || 
|-id=553 bgcolor=#d6d6d6
| 108553 ||  || — || June 15, 2001 || Socorro || LINEAR || — || align=right | 9.3 km || 
|-id=554 bgcolor=#E9E9E9
| 108554 ||  || — || June 15, 2001 || Palomar || NEAT || HNS || align=right | 3.7 km || 
|-id=555 bgcolor=#fefefe
| 108555 ||  || — || June 15, 2001 || Socorro || LINEAR || NYS || align=right | 1.5 km || 
|-id=556 bgcolor=#fefefe
| 108556 ||  || — || June 15, 2001 || Socorro || LINEAR || — || align=right | 1.8 km || 
|-id=557 bgcolor=#E9E9E9
| 108557 ||  || — || June 15, 2001 || Socorro || LINEAR || — || align=right | 2.7 km || 
|-id=558 bgcolor=#d6d6d6
| 108558 ||  || — || June 12, 2001 || Anderson Mesa || LONEOS || — || align=right | 4.4 km || 
|-id=559 bgcolor=#fefefe
| 108559 ||  || — || June 13, 2001 || Kitt Peak || Spacewatch || — || align=right | 1.9 km || 
|-id=560 bgcolor=#E9E9E9
| 108560 ||  || — || June 14, 2001 || Kitt Peak || Spacewatch || — || align=right | 3.8 km || 
|-id=561 bgcolor=#d6d6d6
| 108561 ||  || — || June 15, 2001 || Socorro || LINEAR || — || align=right | 8.1 km || 
|-id=562 bgcolor=#E9E9E9
| 108562 ||  || — || June 15, 2001 || Socorro || LINEAR || — || align=right | 2.6 km || 
|-id=563 bgcolor=#d6d6d6
| 108563 ||  || — || June 15, 2001 || Haleakala || NEAT || — || align=right | 3.9 km || 
|-id=564 bgcolor=#E9E9E9
| 108564 ||  || — || June 15, 2001 || Palomar || NEAT || — || align=right | 3.3 km || 
|-id=565 bgcolor=#d6d6d6
| 108565 || 2001 MC || — || June 16, 2001 || Desert Beaver || W. K. Y. Yeung || 3:2 || align=right | 11 km || 
|-id=566 bgcolor=#E9E9E9
| 108566 || 2001 MF || — || June 16, 2001 || Desert Beaver || W. K. Y. Yeung || — || align=right | 4.9 km || 
|-id=567 bgcolor=#fefefe
| 108567 || 2001 MY || — || June 18, 2001 || Desert Beaver || W. K. Y. Yeung || MAS || align=right | 1.3 km || 
|-id=568 bgcolor=#E9E9E9
| 108568 ||  || — || June 18, 2001 || Reedy Creek || J. Broughton || — || align=right | 2.8 km || 
|-id=569 bgcolor=#E9E9E9
| 108569 ||  || — || June 18, 2001 || Reedy Creek || J. Broughton || — || align=right | 4.1 km || 
|-id=570 bgcolor=#d6d6d6
| 108570 ||  || — || June 19, 2001 || Socorro || LINEAR || EUP || align=right | 11 km || 
|-id=571 bgcolor=#E9E9E9
| 108571 ||  || — || June 16, 2001 || Palomar || NEAT || — || align=right | 4.3 km || 
|-id=572 bgcolor=#fefefe
| 108572 ||  || — || June 16, 2001 || Socorro || LINEAR || NYS || align=right | 3.6 km || 
|-id=573 bgcolor=#FA8072
| 108573 ||  || — || June 17, 2001 || Palomar || NEAT || PHO || align=right | 2.0 km || 
|-id=574 bgcolor=#fefefe
| 108574 ||  || — || June 17, 2001 || Palomar || NEAT || — || align=right | 1.9 km || 
|-id=575 bgcolor=#E9E9E9
| 108575 ||  || — || June 18, 2001 || Palomar || NEAT || EUN || align=right | 2.3 km || 
|-id=576 bgcolor=#E9E9E9
| 108576 ||  || — || June 21, 2001 || Palomar || NEAT || — || align=right | 4.3 km || 
|-id=577 bgcolor=#E9E9E9
| 108577 ||  || — || June 21, 2001 || Palomar || NEAT || MAR || align=right | 2.5 km || 
|-id=578 bgcolor=#d6d6d6
| 108578 ||  || — || June 23, 2001 || Palomar || NEAT || 7:4 || align=right | 5.5 km || 
|-id=579 bgcolor=#d6d6d6
| 108579 ||  || — || June 20, 2001 || Haleakala || NEAT || — || align=right | 8.8 km || 
|-id=580 bgcolor=#d6d6d6
| 108580 ||  || — || June 20, 2001 || Haleakala || NEAT || — || align=right | 5.8 km || 
|-id=581 bgcolor=#fefefe
| 108581 ||  || — || June 16, 2001 || Haleakala || NEAT || NYS || align=right | 1.9 km || 
|-id=582 bgcolor=#fefefe
| 108582 ||  || — || June 19, 2001 || Palomar || NEAT || MAS || align=right | 1.5 km || 
|-id=583 bgcolor=#E9E9E9
| 108583 ||  || — || June 21, 2001 || Palomar || NEAT || — || align=right | 3.6 km || 
|-id=584 bgcolor=#E9E9E9
| 108584 ||  || — || June 21, 2001 || Palomar || NEAT || — || align=right | 7.5 km || 
|-id=585 bgcolor=#fefefe
| 108585 ||  || — || June 22, 2001 || Palomar || NEAT || V || align=right | 2.1 km || 
|-id=586 bgcolor=#fefefe
| 108586 ||  || — || June 23, 2001 || Palomar || NEAT || — || align=right | 2.8 km || 
|-id=587 bgcolor=#E9E9E9
| 108587 ||  || — || June 24, 2001 || Palomar || NEAT || MAR || align=right | 2.7 km || 
|-id=588 bgcolor=#fefefe
| 108588 ||  || — || June 21, 2001 || Palomar || NEAT || — || align=right | 1.8 km || 
|-id=589 bgcolor=#d6d6d6
| 108589 ||  || — || June 25, 2001 || Palomar || NEAT || — || align=right | 3.7 km || 
|-id=590 bgcolor=#fefefe
| 108590 ||  || — || June 21, 2001 || Palomar || NEAT || — || align=right | 2.0 km || 
|-id=591 bgcolor=#E9E9E9
| 108591 ||  || — || June 23, 2001 || Palomar || NEAT || — || align=right | 2.8 km || 
|-id=592 bgcolor=#fefefe
| 108592 ||  || — || June 23, 2001 || Palomar || NEAT || slow? || align=right | 2.2 km || 
|-id=593 bgcolor=#d6d6d6
| 108593 ||  || — || June 25, 2001 || Palomar || NEAT || EOS || align=right | 4.1 km || 
|-id=594 bgcolor=#E9E9E9
| 108594 ||  || — || June 28, 2001 || Anderson Mesa || LONEOS || — || align=right | 2.6 km || 
|-id=595 bgcolor=#fefefe
| 108595 ||  || — || June 25, 2001 || Palomar || NEAT || FLO || align=right | 1.5 km || 
|-id=596 bgcolor=#E9E9E9
| 108596 ||  || — || June 25, 2001 || Palomar || NEAT || — || align=right | 2.9 km || 
|-id=597 bgcolor=#d6d6d6
| 108597 ||  || — || June 27, 2001 || Palomar || NEAT || 3:2 || align=right | 9.2 km || 
|-id=598 bgcolor=#E9E9E9
| 108598 ||  || — || June 27, 2001 || Kitt Peak || Spacewatch || — || align=right | 4.1 km || 
|-id=599 bgcolor=#E9E9E9
| 108599 ||  || — || June 28, 2001 || Anderson Mesa || LONEOS || — || align=right | 5.6 km || 
|-id=600 bgcolor=#d6d6d6
| 108600 ||  || — || June 29, 2001 || Anderson Mesa || LONEOS || — || align=right | 8.5 km || 
|}

108601–108700 

|-bgcolor=#E9E9E9
| 108601 ||  || — || June 24, 2001 || Palomar || NEAT || — || align=right | 2.3 km || 
|-id=602 bgcolor=#d6d6d6
| 108602 ||  || — || June 29, 2001 || Anderson Mesa || LONEOS || MEL || align=right | 11 km || 
|-id=603 bgcolor=#E9E9E9
| 108603 ||  || — || June 20, 2001 || Haleakala || NEAT || — || align=right | 4.2 km || 
|-id=604 bgcolor=#fefefe
| 108604 ||  || — || June 21, 2001 || Palomar || NEAT || — || align=right | 1.8 km || 
|-id=605 bgcolor=#fefefe
| 108605 ||  || — || June 25, 2001 || Palomar || NEAT || V || align=right | 1.5 km || 
|-id=606 bgcolor=#fefefe
| 108606 ||  || — || June 25, 2001 || Palomar || NEAT || FLO || align=right | 1.1 km || 
|-id=607 bgcolor=#d6d6d6
| 108607 ||  || — || June 26, 2001 || Palomar || NEAT || — || align=right | 7.5 km || 
|-id=608 bgcolor=#fefefe
| 108608 ||  || — || June 26, 2001 || Palomar || NEAT || — || align=right | 1.6 km || 
|-id=609 bgcolor=#fefefe
| 108609 ||  || — || June 26, 2001 || Palomar || NEAT || NYS || align=right | 4.0 km || 
|-id=610 bgcolor=#d6d6d6
| 108610 ||  || — || June 27, 2001 || Palomar || NEAT || — || align=right | 5.7 km || 
|-id=611 bgcolor=#fefefe
| 108611 ||  || — || June 27, 2001 || Palomar || NEAT || V || align=right | 1.4 km || 
|-id=612 bgcolor=#E9E9E9
| 108612 ||  || — || June 28, 2001 || Haleakala || NEAT || — || align=right | 3.0 km || 
|-id=613 bgcolor=#fefefe
| 108613 ||  || — || June 30, 2001 || Palomar || NEAT || — || align=right | 2.0 km || 
|-id=614 bgcolor=#E9E9E9
| 108614 ||  || — || June 17, 2001 || Anderson Mesa || LONEOS || — || align=right | 3.0 km || 
|-id=615 bgcolor=#E9E9E9
| 108615 ||  || — || June 17, 2001 || Anderson Mesa || LONEOS || — || align=right | 2.2 km || 
|-id=616 bgcolor=#E9E9E9
| 108616 ||  || — || June 17, 2001 || Anderson Mesa || LONEOS || EUNfast? || align=right | 3.3 km || 
|-id=617 bgcolor=#E9E9E9
| 108617 ||  || — || June 19, 2001 || Haleakala || NEAT || — || align=right | 4.0 km || 
|-id=618 bgcolor=#E9E9E9
| 108618 ||  || — || June 19, 2001 || Haleakala || NEAT || ADE || align=right | 6.0 km || 
|-id=619 bgcolor=#fefefe
| 108619 ||  || — || June 19, 2001 || Haleakala || NEAT || — || align=right | 4.4 km || 
|-id=620 bgcolor=#E9E9E9
| 108620 ||  || — || June 19, 2001 || Haleakala || NEAT || — || align=right | 4.6 km || 
|-id=621 bgcolor=#E9E9E9
| 108621 ||  || — || June 20, 2001 || Anderson Mesa || LONEOS || AER || align=right | 3.1 km || 
|-id=622 bgcolor=#d6d6d6
| 108622 ||  || — || June 20, 2001 || Anderson Mesa || LONEOS || — || align=right | 7.5 km || 
|-id=623 bgcolor=#E9E9E9
| 108623 ||  || — || June 21, 2001 || Socorro || LINEAR || GEF || align=right | 3.2 km || 
|-id=624 bgcolor=#fefefe
| 108624 ||  || — || June 22, 2001 || Palomar || NEAT || — || align=right | 1.9 km || 
|-id=625 bgcolor=#E9E9E9
| 108625 ||  || — || June 25, 2001 || Palomar || NEAT || — || align=right | 2.4 km || 
|-id=626 bgcolor=#E9E9E9
| 108626 ||  || — || June 26, 2001 || Palomar || NEAT || — || align=right | 2.2 km || 
|-id=627 bgcolor=#fefefe
| 108627 ||  || — || June 27, 2001 || Anderson Mesa || LONEOS || — || align=right | 1.6 km || 
|-id=628 bgcolor=#E9E9E9
| 108628 ||  || — || June 27, 2001 || Anderson Mesa || LONEOS || — || align=right | 2.6 km || 
|-id=629 bgcolor=#fefefe
| 108629 ||  || — || June 27, 2001 || Anderson Mesa || LONEOS || NYS || align=right | 1.6 km || 
|-id=630 bgcolor=#E9E9E9
| 108630 ||  || — || June 27, 2001 || Anderson Mesa || LONEOS || — || align=right | 3.3 km || 
|-id=631 bgcolor=#fefefe
| 108631 || 2001 NG || — || July 10, 2001 || Palomar || NEAT || SUL || align=right | 4.7 km || 
|-id=632 bgcolor=#d6d6d6
| 108632 ||  || — || July 13, 2001 || Palomar || NEAT || — || align=right | 6.1 km || 
|-id=633 bgcolor=#d6d6d6
| 108633 ||  || — || July 13, 2001 || Palomar || NEAT || — || align=right | 5.4 km || 
|-id=634 bgcolor=#E9E9E9
| 108634 ||  || — || July 13, 2001 || Palomar || NEAT || GEF || align=right | 3.2 km || 
|-id=635 bgcolor=#fefefe
| 108635 ||  || — || July 13, 2001 || Palomar || NEAT || MAS || align=right | 1.3 km || 
|-id=636 bgcolor=#d6d6d6
| 108636 ||  || — || July 13, 2001 || Palomar || NEAT || — || align=right | 4.8 km || 
|-id=637 bgcolor=#fefefe
| 108637 ||  || — || July 13, 2001 || Palomar || NEAT || — || align=right | 2.6 km || 
|-id=638 bgcolor=#d6d6d6
| 108638 ||  || — || July 13, 2001 || Haleakala || NEAT || ALA || align=right | 8.6 km || 
|-id=639 bgcolor=#E9E9E9
| 108639 ||  || — || July 14, 2001 || Palomar || NEAT || — || align=right | 3.7 km || 
|-id=640 bgcolor=#d6d6d6
| 108640 ||  || — || July 12, 2001 || Palomar || NEAT || — || align=right | 7.5 km || 
|-id=641 bgcolor=#E9E9E9
| 108641 ||  || — || July 15, 2001 || Ondřejov || L. Kotková || — || align=right | 4.4 km || 
|-id=642 bgcolor=#E9E9E9
| 108642 ||  || — || July 13, 2001 || Palomar || NEAT || — || align=right | 4.4 km || 
|-id=643 bgcolor=#fefefe
| 108643 ||  || — || July 14, 2001 || Haleakala || NEAT || — || align=right | 1.6 km || 
|-id=644 bgcolor=#E9E9E9
| 108644 ||  || — || July 14, 2001 || Haleakala || NEAT || — || align=right | 2.7 km || 
|-id=645 bgcolor=#fefefe
| 108645 ||  || — || July 12, 2001 || Palomar || NEAT || V || align=right | 1.2 km || 
|-id=646 bgcolor=#d6d6d6
| 108646 ||  || — || July 13, 2001 || Palomar || NEAT || — || align=right | 4.3 km || 
|-id=647 bgcolor=#fefefe
| 108647 ||  || — || July 14, 2001 || Haleakala || NEAT || — || align=right | 1.4 km || 
|-id=648 bgcolor=#d6d6d6
| 108648 ||  || — || July 13, 2001 || Palomar || NEAT || EOS || align=right | 3.9 km || 
|-id=649 bgcolor=#E9E9E9
| 108649 ||  || — || July 13, 2001 || Palomar || NEAT || — || align=right | 5.5 km || 
|-id=650 bgcolor=#d6d6d6
| 108650 ||  || — || July 14, 2001 || Palomar || NEAT || — || align=right | 6.5 km || 
|-id=651 bgcolor=#fefefe
| 108651 ||  || — || July 14, 2001 || Palomar || NEAT || NYS || align=right | 1.7 km || 
|-id=652 bgcolor=#E9E9E9
| 108652 ||  || — || July 14, 2001 || Palomar || NEAT || AGN || align=right | 2.7 km || 
|-id=653 bgcolor=#E9E9E9
| 108653 ||  || — || July 9, 2001 || Socorro || LINEAR || ADE || align=right | 6.0 km || 
|-id=654 bgcolor=#fefefe
| 108654 ||  || — || July 14, 2001 || Palomar || NEAT || PHO || align=right | 2.1 km || 
|-id=655 bgcolor=#E9E9E9
| 108655 ||  || — || July 12, 2001 || Haleakala || NEAT || — || align=right | 4.6 km || 
|-id=656 bgcolor=#fefefe
| 108656 ||  || — || July 12, 2001 || Haleakala || NEAT || CIM || align=right | 4.0 km || 
|-id=657 bgcolor=#E9E9E9
| 108657 ||  || — || July 12, 2001 || Palomar || NEAT || — || align=right | 2.5 km || 
|-id=658 bgcolor=#E9E9E9
| 108658 ||  || — || July 12, 2001 || Palomar || NEAT || GER || align=right | 5.8 km || 
|-id=659 bgcolor=#fefefe
| 108659 ||  || — || July 13, 2001 || Palomar || NEAT || V || align=right | 1.3 km || 
|-id=660 bgcolor=#d6d6d6
| 108660 ||  || — || July 13, 2001 || Palomar || NEAT || ALA || align=right | 12 km || 
|-id=661 bgcolor=#d6d6d6
| 108661 ||  || — || July 14, 2001 || Palomar || NEAT || 7:4 || align=right | 8.7 km || 
|-id=662 bgcolor=#fefefe
| 108662 ||  || — || July 14, 2001 || Palomar || NEAT || V || align=right | 1.7 km || 
|-id=663 bgcolor=#fefefe
| 108663 ||  || — || July 14, 2001 || Palomar || NEAT || — || align=right | 1.5 km || 
|-id=664 bgcolor=#fefefe
| 108664 ||  || — || July 14, 2001 || Palomar || NEAT || — || align=right | 2.0 km || 
|-id=665 bgcolor=#fefefe
| 108665 ||  || — || July 14, 2001 || Palomar || NEAT || NYS || align=right | 1.9 km || 
|-id=666 bgcolor=#E9E9E9
| 108666 || 2001 OD || — || July 16, 2001 || Anderson Mesa || LONEOS || — || align=right | 3.6 km || 
|-id=667 bgcolor=#fefefe
| 108667 || 2001 OS || — || July 17, 2001 || Palomar || NEAT || — || align=right | 2.4 km || 
|-id=668 bgcolor=#d6d6d6
| 108668 ||  || — || July 18, 2001 || Palomar || NEAT || — || align=right | 6.6 km || 
|-id=669 bgcolor=#E9E9E9
| 108669 ||  || — || July 17, 2001 || Anderson Mesa || LONEOS || — || align=right | 5.8 km || 
|-id=670 bgcolor=#E9E9E9
| 108670 ||  || — || July 19, 2001 || Palomar || NEAT || — || align=right | 8.0 km || 
|-id=671 bgcolor=#d6d6d6
| 108671 ||  || — || July 19, 2001 || Desert Beaver || W. K. Y. Yeung || TIR || align=right | 7.8 km || 
|-id=672 bgcolor=#d6d6d6
| 108672 ||  || — || July 18, 2001 || Palomar || NEAT || — || align=right | 4.4 km || 
|-id=673 bgcolor=#E9E9E9
| 108673 ||  || — || July 16, 2001 || Anderson Mesa || LONEOS || — || align=right | 2.2 km || 
|-id=674 bgcolor=#E9E9E9
| 108674 ||  || — || July 16, 2001 || Anderson Mesa || LONEOS || — || align=right | 3.9 km || 
|-id=675 bgcolor=#fefefe
| 108675 ||  || — || July 17, 2001 || Anderson Mesa || LONEOS || — || align=right | 2.7 km || 
|-id=676 bgcolor=#d6d6d6
| 108676 ||  || — || July 17, 2001 || Anderson Mesa || LONEOS || — || align=right | 6.7 km || 
|-id=677 bgcolor=#d6d6d6
| 108677 ||  || — || July 17, 2001 || Anderson Mesa || LONEOS || URS || align=right | 9.2 km || 
|-id=678 bgcolor=#d6d6d6
| 108678 ||  || — || July 17, 2001 || Anderson Mesa || LONEOS || — || align=right | 6.5 km || 
|-id=679 bgcolor=#E9E9E9
| 108679 ||  || — || July 17, 2001 || Anderson Mesa || LONEOS || MAR || align=right | 2.6 km || 
|-id=680 bgcolor=#E9E9E9
| 108680 ||  || — || July 17, 2001 || Anderson Mesa || LONEOS || — || align=right | 2.2 km || 
|-id=681 bgcolor=#E9E9E9
| 108681 ||  || — || July 17, 2001 || Anderson Mesa || LONEOS || MAR || align=right | 2.5 km || 
|-id=682 bgcolor=#fefefe
| 108682 ||  || — || July 17, 2001 || Anderson Mesa || LONEOS || ERI || align=right | 4.2 km || 
|-id=683 bgcolor=#E9E9E9
| 108683 ||  || — || July 17, 2001 || Anderson Mesa || LONEOS || DOR || align=right | 4.9 km || 
|-id=684 bgcolor=#d6d6d6
| 108684 ||  || — || July 17, 2001 || Anderson Mesa || LONEOS || — || align=right | 4.7 km || 
|-id=685 bgcolor=#fefefe
| 108685 ||  || — || July 17, 2001 || Anderson Mesa || LONEOS || FLO || align=right | 1.4 km || 
|-id=686 bgcolor=#fefefe
| 108686 ||  || — || July 17, 2001 || Anderson Mesa || LONEOS || — || align=right | 2.1 km || 
|-id=687 bgcolor=#E9E9E9
| 108687 ||  || — || July 17, 2001 || Anderson Mesa || LONEOS || — || align=right | 2.5 km || 
|-id=688 bgcolor=#fefefe
| 108688 ||  || — || July 20, 2001 || Anderson Mesa || LONEOS || V || align=right | 1.4 km || 
|-id=689 bgcolor=#E9E9E9
| 108689 ||  || — || July 17, 2001 || Haleakala || NEAT || — || align=right | 5.3 km || 
|-id=690 bgcolor=#E9E9E9
| 108690 ||  || — || July 19, 2001 || Palomar || NEAT || MAR || align=right | 2.3 km || 
|-id=691 bgcolor=#E9E9E9
| 108691 ||  || — || July 20, 2001 || Palomar || NEAT || EUN || align=right | 2.6 km || 
|-id=692 bgcolor=#fefefe
| 108692 ||  || — || July 18, 2001 || Palomar || NEAT || — || align=right | 1.9 km || 
|-id=693 bgcolor=#E9E9E9
| 108693 ||  || — || July 19, 2001 || Palomar || NEAT || — || align=right | 3.4 km || 
|-id=694 bgcolor=#E9E9E9
| 108694 ||  || — || July 20, 2001 || Palomar || NEAT || — || align=right | 4.3 km || 
|-id=695 bgcolor=#d6d6d6
| 108695 ||  || — || July 20, 2001 || Palomar || NEAT || — || align=right | 5.1 km || 
|-id=696 bgcolor=#E9E9E9
| 108696 ||  || — || July 21, 2001 || Anderson Mesa || LONEOS || — || align=right | 3.6 km || 
|-id=697 bgcolor=#E9E9E9
| 108697 ||  || — || July 20, 2001 || Socorro || LINEAR || — || align=right | 1.9 km || 
|-id=698 bgcolor=#E9E9E9
| 108698 ||  || — || July 20, 2001 || Socorro || LINEAR || — || align=right | 6.3 km || 
|-id=699 bgcolor=#d6d6d6
| 108699 ||  || — || July 18, 2001 || Palomar || NEAT || ALA || align=right | 7.0 km || 
|-id=700 bgcolor=#fefefe
| 108700 ||  || — || July 18, 2001 || Palomar || NEAT || — || align=right | 1.7 km || 
|}

108701–108800 

|-bgcolor=#d6d6d6
| 108701 ||  || — || July 21, 2001 || Palomar || NEAT || — || align=right | 7.6 km || 
|-id=702 bgcolor=#d6d6d6
| 108702 ||  || — || July 21, 2001 || San Marcello || M. Tombelli, G. Forti || EMA || align=right | 7.9 km || 
|-id=703 bgcolor=#E9E9E9
| 108703 ||  || — || July 17, 2001 || Haleakala || NEAT || GEF || align=right | 1.9 km || 
|-id=704 bgcolor=#fefefe
| 108704 ||  || — || July 17, 2001 || Haleakala || NEAT || — || align=right | 1.8 km || 
|-id=705 bgcolor=#d6d6d6
| 108705 ||  || — || July 17, 2001 || Haleakala || NEAT || — || align=right | 5.6 km || 
|-id=706 bgcolor=#d6d6d6
| 108706 ||  || — || July 17, 2001 || Haleakala || NEAT || HYG || align=right | 4.9 km || 
|-id=707 bgcolor=#d6d6d6
| 108707 ||  || — || July 19, 2001 || Palomar || NEAT || — || align=right | 6.2 km || 
|-id=708 bgcolor=#d6d6d6
| 108708 ||  || — || July 21, 2001 || Anderson Mesa || LONEOS || ALA || align=right | 8.4 km || 
|-id=709 bgcolor=#E9E9E9
| 108709 ||  || — || July 21, 2001 || Anderson Mesa || LONEOS || MAR || align=right | 2.1 km || 
|-id=710 bgcolor=#fefefe
| 108710 ||  || — || July 21, 2001 || Anderson Mesa || LONEOS || — || align=right | 2.2 km || 
|-id=711 bgcolor=#fefefe
| 108711 ||  || — || July 21, 2001 || Anderson Mesa || LONEOS || — || align=right | 2.0 km || 
|-id=712 bgcolor=#d6d6d6
| 108712 ||  || — || July 21, 2001 || Anderson Mesa || LONEOS || — || align=right | 7.5 km || 
|-id=713 bgcolor=#fefefe
| 108713 ||  || — || July 17, 2001 || Palomar || NEAT || — || align=right | 4.3 km || 
|-id=714 bgcolor=#d6d6d6
| 108714 ||  || — || July 18, 2001 || Palomar || NEAT || — || align=right | 4.7 km || 
|-id=715 bgcolor=#d6d6d6
| 108715 ||  || — || July 19, 2001 || Palomar || NEAT || EUP || align=right | 8.8 km || 
|-id=716 bgcolor=#E9E9E9
| 108716 ||  || — || July 21, 2001 || Palomar || NEAT || — || align=right | 2.7 km || 
|-id=717 bgcolor=#fefefe
| 108717 ||  || — || July 22, 2001 || Palomar || NEAT || — || align=right | 2.2 km || 
|-id=718 bgcolor=#E9E9E9
| 108718 ||  || — || July 22, 2001 || Palomar || NEAT || — || align=right | 2.0 km || 
|-id=719 bgcolor=#d6d6d6
| 108719 ||  || — || July 22, 2001 || Palomar || NEAT || — || align=right | 5.3 km || 
|-id=720 bgcolor=#E9E9E9
| 108720 Kamikuroiwa ||  ||  || July 22, 2001 || Kuma Kogen || A. Nakamura || — || align=right | 5.2 km || 
|-id=721 bgcolor=#d6d6d6
| 108721 ||  || — || July 16, 2001 || Anderson Mesa || LONEOS || TRP || align=right | 6.4 km || 
|-id=722 bgcolor=#fefefe
| 108722 ||  || — || July 16, 2001 || Anderson Mesa || LONEOS || — || align=right | 1.5 km || 
|-id=723 bgcolor=#fefefe
| 108723 ||  || — || July 16, 2001 || Anderson Mesa || LONEOS || V || align=right | 1.3 km || 
|-id=724 bgcolor=#d6d6d6
| 108724 ||  || — || July 16, 2001 || Anderson Mesa || LONEOS || — || align=right | 5.3 km || 
|-id=725 bgcolor=#E9E9E9
| 108725 ||  || — || July 18, 2001 || Haleakala || NEAT || — || align=right | 1.7 km || 
|-id=726 bgcolor=#fefefe
| 108726 ||  || — || July 19, 2001 || Haleakala || NEAT || NYS || align=right | 1.5 km || 
|-id=727 bgcolor=#d6d6d6
| 108727 ||  || — || July 18, 2001 || Palomar || NEAT || — || align=right | 9.5 km || 
|-id=728 bgcolor=#fefefe
| 108728 ||  || — || July 18, 2001 || Palomar || NEAT || — || align=right | 2.0 km || 
|-id=729 bgcolor=#E9E9E9
| 108729 ||  || — || July 18, 2001 || Palomar || NEAT || — || align=right | 3.9 km || 
|-id=730 bgcolor=#d6d6d6
| 108730 ||  || — || July 19, 2001 || Palomar || NEAT || — || align=right | 7.1 km || 
|-id=731 bgcolor=#d6d6d6
| 108731 ||  || — || July 19, 2001 || Palomar || NEAT || 628 || align=right | 3.4 km || 
|-id=732 bgcolor=#fefefe
| 108732 ||  || — || July 19, 2001 || Palomar || NEAT || — || align=right | 2.0 km || 
|-id=733 bgcolor=#E9E9E9
| 108733 ||  || — || July 19, 2001 || Palomar || NEAT || — || align=right | 1.9 km || 
|-id=734 bgcolor=#E9E9E9
| 108734 ||  || — || July 23, 2001 || Reedy Creek || J. Broughton || — || align=right | 7.3 km || 
|-id=735 bgcolor=#E9E9E9
| 108735 ||  || — || July 24, 2001 || McDonald || J. G. Ries || — || align=right | 3.6 km || 
|-id=736 bgcolor=#fefefe
| 108736 ||  || — || July 24, 2001 || Lake Tekapo || I. P. Griffin, N. Brady || — || align=right | 1.4 km || 
|-id=737 bgcolor=#fefefe
| 108737 ||  || — || July 19, 2001 || Palomar || NEAT || — || align=right | 1.6 km || 
|-id=738 bgcolor=#E9E9E9
| 108738 ||  || — || July 19, 2001 || Palomar || NEAT || — || align=right | 2.0 km || 
|-id=739 bgcolor=#fefefe
| 108739 ||  || — || July 20, 2001 || Palomar || NEAT || — || align=right | 4.0 km || 
|-id=740 bgcolor=#d6d6d6
| 108740 ||  || — || July 20, 2001 || Palomar || NEAT || — || align=right | 5.4 km || 
|-id=741 bgcolor=#E9E9E9
| 108741 ||  || — || July 20, 2001 || Palomar || NEAT || — || align=right | 2.2 km || 
|-id=742 bgcolor=#fefefe
| 108742 ||  || — || July 20, 2001 || Palomar || NEAT || — || align=right | 1.8 km || 
|-id=743 bgcolor=#d6d6d6
| 108743 ||  || — || July 20, 2001 || Palomar || NEAT || — || align=right | 4.7 km || 
|-id=744 bgcolor=#d6d6d6
| 108744 ||  || — || July 20, 2001 || Palomar || NEAT || — || align=right | 5.6 km || 
|-id=745 bgcolor=#E9E9E9
| 108745 ||  || — || July 20, 2001 || Palomar || NEAT || — || align=right | 3.1 km || 
|-id=746 bgcolor=#fefefe
| 108746 ||  || — || July 21, 2001 || Palomar || NEAT || — || align=right | 1.6 km || 
|-id=747 bgcolor=#E9E9E9
| 108747 ||  || — || July 22, 2001 || Palomar || NEAT || RAF || align=right | 1.7 km || 
|-id=748 bgcolor=#E9E9E9
| 108748 ||  || — || July 22, 2001 || Palomar || NEAT || — || align=right | 4.8 km || 
|-id=749 bgcolor=#E9E9E9
| 108749 ||  || — || July 22, 2001 || Palomar || NEAT || — || align=right | 2.3 km || 
|-id=750 bgcolor=#E9E9E9
| 108750 ||  || — || July 22, 2001 || Palomar || NEAT || — || align=right | 4.8 km || 
|-id=751 bgcolor=#d6d6d6
| 108751 ||  || — || July 22, 2001 || Palomar || NEAT || — || align=right | 6.5 km || 
|-id=752 bgcolor=#d6d6d6
| 108752 ||  || — || July 22, 2001 || Palomar || NEAT || EOS || align=right | 4.4 km || 
|-id=753 bgcolor=#E9E9E9
| 108753 ||  || — || July 23, 2001 || Palomar || NEAT || NEM || align=right | 5.3 km || 
|-id=754 bgcolor=#E9E9E9
| 108754 ||  || — || July 23, 2001 || Palomar || NEAT || — || align=right | 2.8 km || 
|-id=755 bgcolor=#d6d6d6
| 108755 ||  || — || July 23, 2001 || Palomar || NEAT || EMA || align=right | 7.3 km || 
|-id=756 bgcolor=#fefefe
| 108756 ||  || — || July 23, 2001 || Haleakala || NEAT || NYS || align=right | 1.3 km || 
|-id=757 bgcolor=#E9E9E9
| 108757 ||  || — || July 16, 2001 || Anderson Mesa || LONEOS || — || align=right | 2.7 km || 
|-id=758 bgcolor=#fefefe
| 108758 ||  || — || July 16, 2001 || Anderson Mesa || LONEOS || MAS || align=right | 2.9 km || 
|-id=759 bgcolor=#d6d6d6
| 108759 ||  || — || July 16, 2001 || Anderson Mesa || LONEOS || — || align=right | 7.5 km || 
|-id=760 bgcolor=#E9E9E9
| 108760 ||  || — || July 16, 2001 || Anderson Mesa || LONEOS || — || align=right | 2.4 km || 
|-id=761 bgcolor=#fefefe
| 108761 ||  || — || July 16, 2001 || Anderson Mesa || LONEOS || NYS || align=right | 1.3 km || 
|-id=762 bgcolor=#fefefe
| 108762 ||  || — || July 16, 2001 || Anderson Mesa || LONEOS || — || align=right | 1.9 km || 
|-id=763 bgcolor=#d6d6d6
| 108763 ||  || — || July 16, 2001 || Anderson Mesa || LONEOS || — || align=right | 8.2 km || 
|-id=764 bgcolor=#fefefe
| 108764 ||  || — || July 16, 2001 || Haleakala || NEAT || — || align=right | 3.9 km || 
|-id=765 bgcolor=#d6d6d6
| 108765 ||  || — || July 16, 2001 || Haleakala || NEAT || — || align=right | 8.7 km || 
|-id=766 bgcolor=#fefefe
| 108766 ||  || — || July 16, 2001 || Haleakala || NEAT || — || align=right | 1.9 km || 
|-id=767 bgcolor=#fefefe
| 108767 ||  || — || July 17, 2001 || Anderson Mesa || LONEOS || V || align=right | 1.4 km || 
|-id=768 bgcolor=#d6d6d6
| 108768 ||  || — || July 20, 2001 || Palomar || NEAT || — || align=right | 4.6 km || 
|-id=769 bgcolor=#fefefe
| 108769 ||  || — || July 21, 2001 || Palomar || NEAT || NYS || align=right | 1.2 km || 
|-id=770 bgcolor=#d6d6d6
| 108770 ||  || — || July 21, 2001 || Palomar || NEAT || — || align=right | 3.8 km || 
|-id=771 bgcolor=#d6d6d6
| 108771 ||  || — || July 21, 2001 || Palomar || NEAT || — || align=right | 4.3 km || 
|-id=772 bgcolor=#E9E9E9
| 108772 ||  || — || July 21, 2001 || Palomar || NEAT || — || align=right | 2.3 km || 
|-id=773 bgcolor=#d6d6d6
| 108773 ||  || — || July 21, 2001 || Palomar || NEAT || — || align=right | 7.3 km || 
|-id=774 bgcolor=#d6d6d6
| 108774 ||  || — || July 21, 2001 || Palomar || NEAT || — || align=right | 6.4 km || 
|-id=775 bgcolor=#d6d6d6
| 108775 ||  || — || July 21, 2001 || Palomar || NEAT || — || align=right | 6.7 km || 
|-id=776 bgcolor=#E9E9E9
| 108776 ||  || — || July 21, 2001 || Palomar || NEAT || — || align=right | 3.1 km || 
|-id=777 bgcolor=#d6d6d6
| 108777 ||  || — || July 22, 2001 || Palomar || NEAT || AEG || align=right | 7.4 km || 
|-id=778 bgcolor=#d6d6d6
| 108778 ||  || — || July 22, 2001 || Palomar || NEAT || — || align=right | 5.9 km || 
|-id=779 bgcolor=#E9E9E9
| 108779 ||  || — || July 22, 2001 || Palomar || NEAT || — || align=right | 2.4 km || 
|-id=780 bgcolor=#E9E9E9
| 108780 ||  || — || July 20, 2001 || Palomar || NEAT || — || align=right | 4.1 km || 
|-id=781 bgcolor=#E9E9E9
| 108781 ||  || — || July 20, 2001 || Palomar || NEAT || — || align=right | 3.6 km || 
|-id=782 bgcolor=#fefefe
| 108782 ||  || — || July 21, 2001 || Haleakala || NEAT || — || align=right | 1.6 km || 
|-id=783 bgcolor=#d6d6d6
| 108783 ||  || — || July 20, 2001 || Anderson Mesa || LONEOS || — || align=right | 6.0 km || 
|-id=784 bgcolor=#E9E9E9
| 108784 ||  || — || July 20, 2001 || Anderson Mesa || LONEOS || — || align=right | 7.2 km || 
|-id=785 bgcolor=#E9E9E9
| 108785 ||  || — || July 26, 2001 || Desert Beaver || W. K. Y. Yeung || — || align=right | 1.8 km || 
|-id=786 bgcolor=#E9E9E9
| 108786 ||  || — || July 26, 2001 || Desert Beaver || W. K. Y. Yeung || — || align=right | 5.0 km || 
|-id=787 bgcolor=#d6d6d6
| 108787 ||  || — || July 19, 2001 || Haleakala || NEAT || — || align=right | 8.4 km || 
|-id=788 bgcolor=#d6d6d6
| 108788 ||  || — || July 24, 2001 || Haleakala || NEAT || — || align=right | 4.9 km || 
|-id=789 bgcolor=#d6d6d6
| 108789 ||  || — || July 22, 2001 || Palomar || NEAT || TEL || align=right | 3.2 km || 
|-id=790 bgcolor=#E9E9E9
| 108790 ||  || — || July 28, 2001 || Reedy Creek || J. Broughton || — || align=right | 2.3 km || 
|-id=791 bgcolor=#E9E9E9
| 108791 ||  || — || July 22, 2001 || Socorro || LINEAR || — || align=right | 2.2 km || 
|-id=792 bgcolor=#E9E9E9
| 108792 ||  || — || July 22, 2001 || Socorro || LINEAR || — || align=right | 3.0 km || 
|-id=793 bgcolor=#fefefe
| 108793 ||  || — || July 22, 2001 || Palomar || NEAT || V || align=right | 1.9 km || 
|-id=794 bgcolor=#E9E9E9
| 108794 ||  || — || July 27, 2001 || Palomar || NEAT || — || align=right | 2.7 km || 
|-id=795 bgcolor=#fefefe
| 108795 ||  || — || July 16, 2001 || Anderson Mesa || LONEOS || NYS || align=right | 1.9 km || 
|-id=796 bgcolor=#E9E9E9
| 108796 ||  || — || July 16, 2001 || Anderson Mesa || LONEOS || — || align=right | 2.8 km || 
|-id=797 bgcolor=#fefefe
| 108797 ||  || — || July 19, 2001 || Anderson Mesa || LONEOS || — || align=right | 1.7 km || 
|-id=798 bgcolor=#E9E9E9
| 108798 ||  || — || July 19, 2001 || Anderson Mesa || LONEOS || — || align=right | 2.4 km || 
|-id=799 bgcolor=#E9E9E9
| 108799 ||  || — || July 19, 2001 || Palomar || NEAT || — || align=right | 3.7 km || 
|-id=800 bgcolor=#E9E9E9
| 108800 ||  || — || July 21, 2001 || Kitt Peak || Spacewatch || — || align=right | 4.4 km || 
|}

108801–108900 

|-bgcolor=#E9E9E9
| 108801 ||  || — || July 21, 2001 || Haleakala || NEAT || — || align=right | 3.3 km || 
|-id=802 bgcolor=#d6d6d6
| 108802 ||  || — || July 21, 2001 || Anderson Mesa || LONEOS || — || align=right | 4.7 km || 
|-id=803 bgcolor=#E9E9E9
| 108803 ||  || — || July 21, 2001 || Anderson Mesa || LONEOS || — || align=right | 3.1 km || 
|-id=804 bgcolor=#E9E9E9
| 108804 ||  || — || July 21, 2001 || Kitt Peak || Spacewatch || — || align=right | 2.7 km || 
|-id=805 bgcolor=#fefefe
| 108805 ||  || — || July 21, 2001 || Kitt Peak || Spacewatch || — || align=right | 2.0 km || 
|-id=806 bgcolor=#d6d6d6
| 108806 ||  || — || July 19, 2001 || Palomar || NEAT || — || align=right | 7.7 km || 
|-id=807 bgcolor=#E9E9E9
| 108807 ||  || — || July 29, 2001 || Reedy Creek || J. Broughton || — || align=right | 5.5 km || 
|-id=808 bgcolor=#E9E9E9
| 108808 ||  || — || July 29, 2001 || Socorro || LINEAR || — || align=right | 5.4 km || 
|-id=809 bgcolor=#d6d6d6
| 108809 ||  || — || July 29, 2001 || Socorro || LINEAR || TIR || align=right | 6.1 km || 
|-id=810 bgcolor=#fefefe
| 108810 ||  || — || July 29, 2001 || Socorro || LINEAR || V || align=right | 1.6 km || 
|-id=811 bgcolor=#fefefe
| 108811 ||  || — || July 29, 2001 || Socorro || LINEAR || — || align=right | 3.2 km || 
|-id=812 bgcolor=#E9E9E9
| 108812 ||  || — || July 24, 2001 || Palomar || NEAT || — || align=right | 5.9 km || 
|-id=813 bgcolor=#E9E9E9
| 108813 ||  || — || July 24, 2001 || Palomar || NEAT || — || align=right | 2.4 km || 
|-id=814 bgcolor=#d6d6d6
| 108814 ||  || — || July 25, 2001 || Palomar || NEAT || — || align=right | 6.6 km || 
|-id=815 bgcolor=#d6d6d6
| 108815 ||  || — || July 29, 2001 || Palomar || NEAT || HYG || align=right | 5.7 km || 
|-id=816 bgcolor=#d6d6d6
| 108816 ||  || — || July 22, 2001 || Palomar || NEAT || HYG || align=right | 5.7 km || 
|-id=817 bgcolor=#d6d6d6
| 108817 ||  || — || July 23, 2001 || Haleakala || NEAT || — || align=right | 6.9 km || 
|-id=818 bgcolor=#fefefe
| 108818 ||  || — || July 26, 2001 || Palomar || NEAT || — || align=right | 2.8 km || 
|-id=819 bgcolor=#fefefe
| 108819 ||  || — || July 26, 2001 || Palomar || NEAT || V || align=right | 1.5 km || 
|-id=820 bgcolor=#fefefe
| 108820 ||  || — || July 26, 2001 || Palomar || NEAT || — || align=right | 1.6 km || 
|-id=821 bgcolor=#d6d6d6
| 108821 ||  || — || July 26, 2001 || Palomar || NEAT || — || align=right | 5.1 km || 
|-id=822 bgcolor=#d6d6d6
| 108822 ||  || — || July 26, 2001 || Palomar || NEAT || — || align=right | 6.2 km || 
|-id=823 bgcolor=#E9E9E9
| 108823 ||  || — || July 26, 2001 || Palomar || NEAT || WIT || align=right | 2.4 km || 
|-id=824 bgcolor=#fefefe
| 108824 ||  || — || July 27, 2001 || Palomar || NEAT || — || align=right | 1.7 km || 
|-id=825 bgcolor=#fefefe
| 108825 ||  || — || July 27, 2001 || Palomar || NEAT || — || align=right | 2.1 km || 
|-id=826 bgcolor=#fefefe
| 108826 ||  || — || July 29, 2001 || Palomar || NEAT || NYS || align=right | 1.2 km || 
|-id=827 bgcolor=#E9E9E9
| 108827 ||  || — || July 29, 2001 || Palomar || NEAT || — || align=right | 2.5 km || 
|-id=828 bgcolor=#fefefe
| 108828 ||  || — || July 26, 2001 || Haleakala || NEAT || — || align=right | 2.2 km || 
|-id=829 bgcolor=#fefefe
| 108829 ||  || — || July 26, 2001 || Haleakala || NEAT || — || align=right | 2.0 km || 
|-id=830 bgcolor=#E9E9E9
| 108830 ||  || — || July 31, 2001 || Palomar || NEAT || — || align=right | 4.2 km || 
|-id=831 bgcolor=#fefefe
| 108831 ||  || — || July 27, 2001 || Palomar || NEAT || NYS || align=right | 3.5 km || 
|-id=832 bgcolor=#fefefe
| 108832 ||  || — || July 28, 2001 || Haleakala || NEAT || NYS || align=right | 1.4 km || 
|-id=833 bgcolor=#E9E9E9
| 108833 ||  || — || July 18, 2001 || Kitt Peak || Spacewatch || NEM || align=right | 3.7 km || 
|-id=834 bgcolor=#E9E9E9
| 108834 ||  || — || July 19, 2001 || Kitt Peak || Spacewatch || EUN || align=right | 1.8 km || 
|-id=835 bgcolor=#fefefe
| 108835 ||  || — || July 19, 2001 || Anderson Mesa || LONEOS || V || align=right | 1.6 km || 
|-id=836 bgcolor=#E9E9E9
| 108836 ||  || — || July 22, 2001 || Socorro || LINEAR || — || align=right | 2.3 km || 
|-id=837 bgcolor=#fefefe
| 108837 ||  || — || July 22, 2001 || Socorro || LINEAR || — || align=right | 2.1 km || 
|-id=838 bgcolor=#E9E9E9
| 108838 ||  || — || July 31, 2001 || Palomar || NEAT || — || align=right | 2.3 km || 
|-id=839 bgcolor=#d6d6d6
| 108839 ||  || — || July 31, 2001 || Palomar || NEAT || — || align=right | 8.7 km || 
|-id=840 bgcolor=#fefefe
| 108840 ||  || — || July 22, 2001 || Socorro || LINEAR || — || align=right | 1.8 km || 
|-id=841 bgcolor=#fefefe
| 108841 ||  || — || July 23, 2001 || Haleakala || NEAT || PHO || align=right | 3.1 km || 
|-id=842 bgcolor=#fefefe
| 108842 ||  || — || July 23, 2001 || Haleakala || NEAT || V || align=right | 1.2 km || 
|-id=843 bgcolor=#fefefe
| 108843 ||  || — || July 23, 2001 || Haleakala || NEAT || — || align=right | 1.7 km || 
|-id=844 bgcolor=#fefefe
| 108844 ||  || — || July 25, 2001 || Haleakala || NEAT || — || align=right | 3.6 km || 
|-id=845 bgcolor=#E9E9E9
| 108845 ||  || — || July 30, 2001 || Palomar || NEAT || — || align=right | 3.6 km || 
|-id=846 bgcolor=#d6d6d6
| 108846 ||  || — || July 31, 2001 || Palomar || NEAT || — || align=right | 7.2 km || 
|-id=847 bgcolor=#d6d6d6
| 108847 ||  || — || July 22, 2001 || Palomar || NEAT || — || align=right | 6.7 km || 
|-id=848 bgcolor=#d6d6d6
| 108848 ||  || — || July 22, 2001 || Palomar || NEAT || — || align=right | 3.6 km || 
|-id=849 bgcolor=#fefefe
| 108849 ||  || — || July 22, 2001 || Palomar || NEAT || — || align=right | 1.6 km || 
|-id=850 bgcolor=#fefefe
| 108850 ||  || — || July 22, 2001 || Palomar || NEAT || — || align=right | 1.8 km || 
|-id=851 bgcolor=#fefefe
| 108851 ||  || — || July 27, 2001 || Anderson Mesa || LONEOS || — || align=right | 1.8 km || 
|-id=852 bgcolor=#d6d6d6
| 108852 ||  || — || July 27, 2001 || Anderson Mesa || LONEOS || KOR || align=right | 2.8 km || 
|-id=853 bgcolor=#fefefe
| 108853 ||  || — || July 27, 2001 || Anderson Mesa || LONEOS || — || align=right | 1.9 km || 
|-id=854 bgcolor=#fefefe
| 108854 ||  || — || July 27, 2001 || Anderson Mesa || LONEOS || MAS || align=right | 1.5 km || 
|-id=855 bgcolor=#fefefe
| 108855 ||  || — || July 27, 2001 || Anderson Mesa || LONEOS || — || align=right | 2.2 km || 
|-id=856 bgcolor=#d6d6d6
| 108856 ||  || — || July 25, 2001 || Bergisch Gladbach || W. Bickel || HYG || align=right | 5.2 km || 
|-id=857 bgcolor=#E9E9E9
| 108857 ||  || — || July 25, 2001 || Bergisch Gladbach || W. Bickel || — || align=right | 2.6 km || 
|-id=858 bgcolor=#fefefe
| 108858 ||  || — || July 23, 2001 || Haleakala || NEAT || V || align=right | 1.6 km || 
|-id=859 bgcolor=#fefefe
| 108859 ||  || — || July 25, 2001 || Haleakala || NEAT || CLA || align=right | 3.9 km || 
|-id=860 bgcolor=#fefefe
| 108860 ||  || — || July 25, 2001 || Haleakala || NEAT || — || align=right | 2.1 km || 
|-id=861 bgcolor=#d6d6d6
| 108861 ||  || — || July 25, 2001 || Haleakala || NEAT || HYG || align=right | 8.4 km || 
|-id=862 bgcolor=#E9E9E9
| 108862 ||  || — || July 25, 2001 || Haleakala || NEAT || — || align=right | 1.8 km || 
|-id=863 bgcolor=#E9E9E9
| 108863 ||  || — || July 26, 2001 || Palomar || NEAT || — || align=right | 2.7 km || 
|-id=864 bgcolor=#E9E9E9
| 108864 ||  || — || July 26, 2001 || Palomar || NEAT || — || align=right | 2.3 km || 
|-id=865 bgcolor=#fefefe
| 108865 ||  || — || July 27, 2001 || Anderson Mesa || LONEOS || MAS || align=right | 2.6 km || 
|-id=866 bgcolor=#fefefe
| 108866 ||  || — || July 27, 2001 || Anderson Mesa || LONEOS || — || align=right | 2.6 km || 
|-id=867 bgcolor=#d6d6d6
| 108867 ||  || — || July 27, 2001 || Anderson Mesa || LONEOS || EOS || align=right | 3.7 km || 
|-id=868 bgcolor=#E9E9E9
| 108868 ||  || — || July 27, 2001 || Anderson Mesa || LONEOS || MRX || align=right | 2.3 km || 
|-id=869 bgcolor=#E9E9E9
| 108869 ||  || — || July 28, 2001 || Anderson Mesa || LONEOS || — || align=right | 3.3 km || 
|-id=870 bgcolor=#fefefe
| 108870 ||  || — || July 28, 2001 || Haleakala || NEAT || V || align=right | 1.5 km || 
|-id=871 bgcolor=#E9E9E9
| 108871 ||  || — || July 28, 2001 || Haleakala || NEAT || — || align=right | 4.0 km || 
|-id=872 bgcolor=#d6d6d6
| 108872 ||  || — || July 29, 2001 || Anderson Mesa || LONEOS || — || align=right | 7.0 km || 
|-id=873 bgcolor=#fefefe
| 108873 ||  || — || July 29, 2001 || Socorro || LINEAR || — || align=right | 4.0 km || 
|-id=874 bgcolor=#E9E9E9
| 108874 ||  || — || July 30, 2001 || Socorro || LINEAR || — || align=right | 2.5 km || 
|-id=875 bgcolor=#E9E9E9
| 108875 ||  || — || July 28, 2001 || Anderson Mesa || LONEOS || EUN || align=right | 3.3 km || 
|-id=876 bgcolor=#E9E9E9
| 108876 ||  || — || July 28, 2001 || Anderson Mesa || LONEOS || — || align=right | 3.4 km || 
|-id=877 bgcolor=#E9E9E9
| 108877 ||  || — || July 29, 2001 || Anderson Mesa || LONEOS || — || align=right | 5.0 km || 
|-id=878 bgcolor=#E9E9E9
| 108878 ||  || — || July 29, 2001 || Socorro || LINEAR || — || align=right | 2.5 km || 
|-id=879 bgcolor=#E9E9E9
| 108879 ||  || — || July 29, 2001 || Anderson Mesa || LONEOS || — || align=right | 3.3 km || 
|-id=880 bgcolor=#E9E9E9
| 108880 ||  || — || July 29, 2001 || Anderson Mesa || LONEOS || MAR || align=right | 2.5 km || 
|-id=881 bgcolor=#E9E9E9
| 108881 ||  || — || July 29, 2001 || Socorro || LINEAR || EUN || align=right | 2.7 km || 
|-id=882 bgcolor=#d6d6d6
| 108882 ||  || — || July 29, 2001 || Socorro || LINEAR || TIR || align=right | 8.0 km || 
|-id=883 bgcolor=#E9E9E9
| 108883 ||  || — || July 29, 2001 || Socorro || LINEAR || — || align=right | 4.0 km || 
|-id=884 bgcolor=#E9E9E9
| 108884 ||  || — || July 29, 2001 || Socorro || LINEAR || — || align=right | 2.9 km || 
|-id=885 bgcolor=#E9E9E9
| 108885 ||  || — || July 29, 2001 || Socorro || LINEAR || EUN || align=right | 3.3 km || 
|-id=886 bgcolor=#E9E9E9
| 108886 ||  || — || July 29, 2001 || Socorro || LINEAR || — || align=right | 2.6 km || 
|-id=887 bgcolor=#fefefe
| 108887 ||  || — || July 27, 2001 || Haleakala || NEAT || — || align=right | 1.6 km || 
|-id=888 bgcolor=#fefefe
| 108888 ||  || — || July 27, 2001 || Anderson Mesa || LONEOS || — || align=right | 1.9 km || 
|-id=889 bgcolor=#d6d6d6
| 108889 || 2001 PX || — || August 2, 2001 || Haleakala || NEAT || — || align=right | 6.6 km || 
|-id=890 bgcolor=#fefefe
| 108890 ||  || — || August 8, 2001 || Palomar || NEAT || NYS || align=right | 1.2 km || 
|-id=891 bgcolor=#fefefe
| 108891 ||  || — || August 3, 2001 || Haleakala || NEAT || V || align=right | 1.4 km || 
|-id=892 bgcolor=#d6d6d6
| 108892 ||  || — || August 3, 2001 || Haleakala || NEAT || slow || align=right | 5.4 km || 
|-id=893 bgcolor=#d6d6d6
| 108893 ||  || — || August 3, 2001 || Haleakala || NEAT || — || align=right | 7.7 km || 
|-id=894 bgcolor=#E9E9E9
| 108894 ||  || — || August 3, 2001 || Haleakala || NEAT || EUN || align=right | 3.0 km || 
|-id=895 bgcolor=#fefefe
| 108895 ||  || — || August 3, 2001 || Haleakala || NEAT || — || align=right | 3.2 km || 
|-id=896 bgcolor=#E9E9E9
| 108896 ||  || — || August 9, 2001 || Palomar || NEAT || WIT || align=right | 2.1 km || 
|-id=897 bgcolor=#fefefe
| 108897 ||  || — || August 6, 2001 || Haleakala || NEAT || NYS || align=right | 1.2 km || 
|-id=898 bgcolor=#d6d6d6
| 108898 ||  || — || August 6, 2001 || Haleakala || NEAT || — || align=right | 8.1 km || 
|-id=899 bgcolor=#E9E9E9
| 108899 ||  || — || August 10, 2001 || Palomar || NEAT || — || align=right | 2.9 km || 
|-id=900 bgcolor=#E9E9E9
| 108900 ||  || — || August 10, 2001 || Haleakala || NEAT || — || align=right | 2.9 km || 
|}

108901–109000 

|-bgcolor=#E9E9E9
| 108901 ||  || — || August 10, 2001 || Haleakala || NEAT || — || align=right | 1.5 km || 
|-id=902 bgcolor=#d6d6d6
| 108902 ||  || — || August 10, 2001 || Haleakala || NEAT || 3:2 || align=right | 8.3 km || 
|-id=903 bgcolor=#d6d6d6
| 108903 ||  || — || August 11, 2001 || Haleakala || NEAT || — || align=right | 7.2 km || 
|-id=904 bgcolor=#d6d6d6
| 108904 ||  || — || August 11, 2001 || Haleakala || NEAT || — || align=right | 7.3 km || 
|-id=905 bgcolor=#E9E9E9
| 108905 ||  || — || August 11, 2001 || Haleakala || NEAT || — || align=right | 6.2 km || 
|-id=906 bgcolor=#FFC2E0
| 108906 ||  || — || August 11, 2001 || Palomar || NEAT || APO +1km || align=right data-sort-value="0.96" | 960 m || 
|-id=907 bgcolor=#fefefe
| 108907 ||  || — || August 8, 2001 || Haleakala || NEAT || NYS || align=right | 1.0 km || 
|-id=908 bgcolor=#E9E9E9
| 108908 ||  || — || August 8, 2001 || Haleakala || NEAT || — || align=right | 1.8 km || 
|-id=909 bgcolor=#E9E9E9
| 108909 ||  || — || August 8, 2001 || Haleakala || NEAT || — || align=right | 2.2 km || 
|-id=910 bgcolor=#d6d6d6
| 108910 ||  || — || August 8, 2001 || Haleakala || NEAT || — || align=right | 6.6 km || 
|-id=911 bgcolor=#d6d6d6
| 108911 ||  || — || August 11, 2001 || Palomar || NEAT || — || align=right | 5.9 km || 
|-id=912 bgcolor=#d6d6d6
| 108912 ||  || — || August 11, 2001 || Haleakala || NEAT || EOS || align=right | 5.3 km || 
|-id=913 bgcolor=#E9E9E9
| 108913 ||  || — || August 12, 2001 || Palomar || NEAT || — || align=right | 4.3 km || 
|-id=914 bgcolor=#d6d6d6
| 108914 ||  || — || August 12, 2001 || Palomar || NEAT || EOS || align=right | 4.5 km || 
|-id=915 bgcolor=#E9E9E9
| 108915 ||  || — || August 7, 2001 || Haleakala || NEAT || — || align=right | 2.0 km || 
|-id=916 bgcolor=#E9E9E9
| 108916 ||  || — || August 8, 2001 || Haleakala || NEAT || GER || align=right | 5.3 km || 
|-id=917 bgcolor=#E9E9E9
| 108917 ||  || — || August 15, 2001 || Emerald Lane || L. Ball || — || align=right | 2.5 km || 
|-id=918 bgcolor=#d6d6d6
| 108918 ||  || — || August 13, 2001 || Kvistaberg || UDAS || — || align=right | 5.9 km || 
|-id=919 bgcolor=#fefefe
| 108919 ||  || — || August 8, 2001 || Haleakala || NEAT || NYS || align=right | 1.5 km || 
|-id=920 bgcolor=#E9E9E9
| 108920 ||  || — || August 9, 2001 || Palomar || NEAT || GEF || align=right | 2.9 km || 
|-id=921 bgcolor=#E9E9E9
| 108921 ||  || — || August 9, 2001 || Palomar || NEAT || — || align=right | 2.4 km || 
|-id=922 bgcolor=#d6d6d6
| 108922 ||  || — || August 9, 2001 || Palomar || NEAT || — || align=right | 7.1 km || 
|-id=923 bgcolor=#fefefe
| 108923 ||  || — || August 9, 2001 || Palomar || NEAT || V || align=right | 1.4 km || 
|-id=924 bgcolor=#d6d6d6
| 108924 ||  || — || August 10, 2001 || Palomar || NEAT || — || align=right | 4.2 km || 
|-id=925 bgcolor=#E9E9E9
| 108925 ||  || — || August 10, 2001 || Haleakala || NEAT || — || align=right | 2.7 km || 
|-id=926 bgcolor=#d6d6d6
| 108926 ||  || — || August 10, 2001 || Haleakala || NEAT || TEL || align=right | 2.9 km || 
|-id=927 bgcolor=#d6d6d6
| 108927 ||  || — || August 10, 2001 || Haleakala || NEAT || — || align=right | 6.2 km || 
|-id=928 bgcolor=#d6d6d6
| 108928 ||  || — || August 10, 2001 || Haleakala || NEAT || URS || align=right | 8.1 km || 
|-id=929 bgcolor=#d6d6d6
| 108929 ||  || — || August 10, 2001 || Haleakala || NEAT || CRO || align=right | 7.8 km || 
|-id=930 bgcolor=#fefefe
| 108930 ||  || — || August 10, 2001 || Haleakala || NEAT || — || align=right | 1.8 km || 
|-id=931 bgcolor=#fefefe
| 108931 ||  || — || August 10, 2001 || Haleakala || NEAT || — || align=right | 1.5 km || 
|-id=932 bgcolor=#d6d6d6
| 108932 ||  || — || August 10, 2001 || Haleakala || NEAT || URS || align=right | 5.6 km || 
|-id=933 bgcolor=#d6d6d6
| 108933 ||  || — || August 10, 2001 || Haleakala || NEAT || — || align=right | 3.8 km || 
|-id=934 bgcolor=#E9E9E9
| 108934 ||  || — || August 11, 2001 || Haleakala || NEAT || — || align=right | 2.1 km || 
|-id=935 bgcolor=#d6d6d6
| 108935 ||  || — || August 11, 2001 || Haleakala || NEAT || — || align=right | 5.3 km || 
|-id=936 bgcolor=#E9E9E9
| 108936 ||  || — || August 11, 2001 || Haleakala || NEAT || — || align=right | 3.4 km || 
|-id=937 bgcolor=#E9E9E9
| 108937 ||  || — || August 11, 2001 || Haleakala || NEAT || — || align=right | 1.8 km || 
|-id=938 bgcolor=#E9E9E9
| 108938 ||  || — || August 11, 2001 || Haleakala || NEAT || EUN || align=right | 2.6 km || 
|-id=939 bgcolor=#fefefe
| 108939 ||  || — || August 11, 2001 || Haleakala || NEAT || — || align=right | 2.1 km || 
|-id=940 bgcolor=#E9E9E9
| 108940 ||  || — || August 11, 2001 || Haleakala || NEAT || — || align=right | 2.3 km || 
|-id=941 bgcolor=#E9E9E9
| 108941 ||  || — || August 11, 2001 || Haleakala || NEAT || — || align=right | 1.8 km || 
|-id=942 bgcolor=#d6d6d6
| 108942 ||  || — || August 11, 2001 || Haleakala || NEAT || — || align=right | 5.8 km || 
|-id=943 bgcolor=#d6d6d6
| 108943 ||  || — || August 11, 2001 || Haleakala || NEAT || — || align=right | 5.2 km || 
|-id=944 bgcolor=#fefefe
| 108944 ||  || — || August 11, 2001 || Haleakala || NEAT || NYS || align=right | 1.7 km || 
|-id=945 bgcolor=#fefefe
| 108945 ||  || — || August 11, 2001 || Haleakala || NEAT || NYS || align=right | 1.2 km || 
|-id=946 bgcolor=#E9E9E9
| 108946 ||  || — || August 11, 2001 || Haleakala || NEAT || — || align=right | 1.9 km || 
|-id=947 bgcolor=#E9E9E9
| 108947 ||  || — || August 13, 2001 || Haleakala || NEAT || AGN || align=right | 2.5 km || 
|-id=948 bgcolor=#fefefe
| 108948 ||  || — || August 14, 2001 || Palomar || NEAT || — || align=right | 3.2 km || 
|-id=949 bgcolor=#d6d6d6
| 108949 ||  || — || August 14, 2001 || Haleakala || NEAT || EOS || align=right | 5.4 km || 
|-id=950 bgcolor=#E9E9E9
| 108950 ||  || — || August 14, 2001 || San Marcello || A. Boattini, L. Tesi || — || align=right | 4.4 km || 
|-id=951 bgcolor=#d6d6d6
| 108951 ||  || — || August 15, 2001 || Reedy Creek || J. Broughton || — || align=right | 11 km || 
|-id=952 bgcolor=#fefefe
| 108952 ||  || — || August 15, 2001 || San Marcello || M. Tombelli, A. Boattini || NYS || align=right | 1.3 km || 
|-id=953 bgcolor=#fefefe
| 108953 Pieraerts ||  ||  || August 13, 2001 || Uccle || T. Pauwels || V || align=right | 1.3 km || 
|-id=954 bgcolor=#d6d6d6
| 108954 ||  || — || August 10, 2001 || Palomar || NEAT || URS || align=right | 6.2 km || 
|-id=955 bgcolor=#E9E9E9
| 108955 ||  || — || August 10, 2001 || Palomar || NEAT || — || align=right | 2.1 km || 
|-id=956 bgcolor=#E9E9E9
| 108956 ||  || — || August 10, 2001 || Palomar || NEAT || — || align=right | 4.8 km || 
|-id=957 bgcolor=#E9E9E9
| 108957 ||  || — || August 10, 2001 || Palomar || NEAT || MAR || align=right | 1.8 km || 
|-id=958 bgcolor=#E9E9E9
| 108958 ||  || — || August 10, 2001 || Palomar || NEAT || — || align=right | 5.2 km || 
|-id=959 bgcolor=#E9E9E9
| 108959 ||  || — || August 10, 2001 || Palomar || NEAT || TIN || align=right | 3.1 km || 
|-id=960 bgcolor=#d6d6d6
| 108960 ||  || — || August 10, 2001 || Palomar || NEAT || — || align=right | 3.9 km || 
|-id=961 bgcolor=#d6d6d6
| 108961 ||  || — || August 10, 2001 || Palomar || NEAT || EOS || align=right | 4.0 km || 
|-id=962 bgcolor=#d6d6d6
| 108962 ||  || — || August 10, 2001 || Palomar || NEAT || EOS || align=right | 4.3 km || 
|-id=963 bgcolor=#E9E9E9
| 108963 ||  || — || August 10, 2001 || Palomar || NEAT || JUN || align=right | 2.5 km || 
|-id=964 bgcolor=#E9E9E9
| 108964 ||  || — || August 10, 2001 || Palomar || NEAT || — || align=right | 4.2 km || 
|-id=965 bgcolor=#d6d6d6
| 108965 ||  || — || August 11, 2001 || Palomar || NEAT || EOS || align=right | 4.8 km || 
|-id=966 bgcolor=#d6d6d6
| 108966 ||  || — || August 11, 2001 || Palomar || NEAT || ALA || align=right | 6.9 km || 
|-id=967 bgcolor=#d6d6d6
| 108967 ||  || — || August 11, 2001 || Palomar || NEAT || — || align=right | 5.0 km || 
|-id=968 bgcolor=#d6d6d6
| 108968 ||  || — || August 11, 2001 || Palomar || NEAT || 7:4 || align=right | 9.2 km || 
|-id=969 bgcolor=#d6d6d6
| 108969 ||  || — || August 11, 2001 || Palomar || NEAT || EOS || align=right | 4.4 km || 
|-id=970 bgcolor=#fefefe
| 108970 ||  || — || August 11, 2001 || Haleakala || NEAT || — || align=right | 1.9 km || 
|-id=971 bgcolor=#d6d6d6
| 108971 ||  || — || August 12, 2001 || Palomar || NEAT || URS || align=right | 7.3 km || 
|-id=972 bgcolor=#E9E9E9
| 108972 ||  || — || August 12, 2001 || Palomar || NEAT || — || align=right | 2.9 km || 
|-id=973 bgcolor=#E9E9E9
| 108973 ||  || — || August 12, 2001 || Palomar || NEAT || ADE || align=right | 3.7 km || 
|-id=974 bgcolor=#d6d6d6
| 108974 ||  || — || August 13, 2001 || Haleakala || NEAT || EOS || align=right | 3.7 km || 
|-id=975 bgcolor=#E9E9E9
| 108975 ||  || — || August 15, 2001 || Haleakala || NEAT || — || align=right | 2.2 km || 
|-id=976 bgcolor=#d6d6d6
| 108976 ||  || — || August 11, 2001 || Haleakala || NEAT || EOS || align=right | 3.5 km || 
|-id=977 bgcolor=#d6d6d6
| 108977 ||  || — || August 13, 2001 || Haleakala || NEAT || — || align=right | 5.2 km || 
|-id=978 bgcolor=#E9E9E9
| 108978 ||  || — || August 13, 2001 || Haleakala || NEAT || — || align=right | 4.0 km || 
|-id=979 bgcolor=#d6d6d6
| 108979 ||  || — || August 3, 2001 || Palomar || NEAT || — || align=right | 9.7 km || 
|-id=980 bgcolor=#d6d6d6
| 108980 ||  || — || August 3, 2001 || Haleakala || NEAT || — || align=right | 4.6 km || 
|-id=981 bgcolor=#d6d6d6
| 108981 ||  || — || August 14, 2001 || Palomar || NEAT || — || align=right | 5.3 km || 
|-id=982 bgcolor=#E9E9E9
| 108982 ||  || — || August 14, 2001 || Palomar || NEAT || — || align=right | 2.4 km || 
|-id=983 bgcolor=#E9E9E9
| 108983 ||  || — || August 14, 2001 || Haleakala || NEAT || WIT || align=right | 1.6 km || 
|-id=984 bgcolor=#d6d6d6
| 108984 ||  || — || August 15, 2001 || Haleakala || NEAT || ARM || align=right | 6.7 km || 
|-id=985 bgcolor=#d6d6d6
| 108985 ||  || — || August 15, 2001 || Haleakala || NEAT || — || align=right | 6.7 km || 
|-id=986 bgcolor=#d6d6d6
| 108986 ||  || — || August 15, 2001 || Haleakala || NEAT || — || align=right | 8.4 km || 
|-id=987 bgcolor=#d6d6d6
| 108987 ||  || — || August 15, 2001 || Haleakala || NEAT || EOS || align=right | 4.0 km || 
|-id=988 bgcolor=#d6d6d6
| 108988 ||  || — || August 14, 2001 || Haleakala || NEAT || KOR || align=right | 2.1 km || 
|-id=989 bgcolor=#d6d6d6
| 108989 ||  || — || August 14, 2001 || Haleakala || NEAT || — || align=right | 4.8 km || 
|-id=990 bgcolor=#d6d6d6
| 108990 ||  || — || August 14, 2001 || Haleakala || NEAT || — || align=right | 4.7 km || 
|-id=991 bgcolor=#d6d6d6
| 108991 ||  || — || August 14, 2001 || Haleakala || NEAT || — || align=right | 4.4 km || 
|-id=992 bgcolor=#fefefe
| 108992 ||  || — || August 14, 2001 || Haleakala || NEAT || NYS || align=right | 4.2 km || 
|-id=993 bgcolor=#E9E9E9
| 108993 ||  || — || August 14, 2001 || Haleakala || NEAT || — || align=right | 1.3 km || 
|-id=994 bgcolor=#E9E9E9
| 108994 ||  || — || August 14, 2001 || Haleakala || NEAT || — || align=right | 5.2 km || 
|-id=995 bgcolor=#E9E9E9
| 108995 ||  || — || August 14, 2001 || Haleakala || NEAT || — || align=right | 2.3 km || 
|-id=996 bgcolor=#d6d6d6
| 108996 ||  || — || August 13, 2001 || Haleakala || NEAT || 3:2 || align=right | 8.1 km || 
|-id=997 bgcolor=#E9E9E9
| 108997 ||  || — || August 13, 2001 || Haleakala || NEAT || — || align=right | 1.5 km || 
|-id=998 bgcolor=#E9E9E9
| 108998 ||  || — || August 13, 2001 || Haleakala || NEAT || — || align=right | 2.3 km || 
|-id=999 bgcolor=#E9E9E9
| 108999 ||  || — || August 13, 2001 || Haleakala || NEAT || MAR || align=right | 1.9 km || 
|-id=000 bgcolor=#d6d6d6
| 109000 ||  || — || August 3, 2001 || Palomar || NEAT || EOS || align=right | 4.4 km || 
|}

References

External links 
 Discovery Circumstances: Numbered Minor Planets (105001)–(110000) (IAU Minor Planet Center)

0108